Christianity has been intricately intertwined with the history and formation of Western society. Throughout its long history, the Church has been a major source of social services like schooling and medical care; an inspiration for art, culture and philosophy; and an influential player in politics and religion. In various ways it has sought to affect Western attitudes towards vice and virtue in diverse fields. Festivals like Easter and Christmas are marked as public holidays; the Gregorian Calendar has been adopted internationally as the civil calendar; and the calendar itself is measured from the date of Jesus's birth.

The cultural influence of the Church has been vast. Church scholars preserved literacy in Western Europe following the Fall of the Western Roman Empire. During the Middle Ages, the Church rose to replace the Roman Empire as the unifying force in Europe. The medieval cathedrals remain among the most iconic architectural feats produced by Western civilization. Many of Europe's universities were also founded by the church at that time. Many historians state that universities and cathedral schools were a continuation of the interest in learning promoted by monasteries. The university is generally regarded as an institution that has its origin in the Medieval Christian setting, born from Cathedral schools. Some scholars and historians attributes Christianity to having contributed to the rise of the Scientific Revolution. The Reformation brought an end to religious unity in the West, but the Renaissance masterpieces produced by Catholic artists like Michelangelo, Leonardo da Vinci and Raphael remain among the most celebrated works of art ever produced. Similarly, Christian sacred music by composers like Pachelbel, Vivaldi, Bach, Handel, Mozart, Haydn, Beethoven, Mendelssohn, Liszt, and Verdi is among the most admired classical music in the Western canon.

The Bible and Christian theology have also strongly influenced Western philosophers and political activists. The teachings of Jesus, such as the Parable of the Good Samaritan, are among the most important sources of modern notions of human rights and the welfare commonly provided by governments in the West. Long-held Christian teachings on sexuality, marriage, and family life have also been influential and controversial in recent times. Christianity in general affected the status of women by condemning marital infidelity, divorce, incest, polygamy, birth control, infanticide (female infants were more likely to be killed), and abortion. While official Catholic Church teaching considers women and men to be complementary (equal and different), some modern "advocates of ordination of women and other feminists" argue that teachings attributed to St. Paul and those of the Fathers of the Church and Scholastic theologians advanced the notion of a divinely ordained female inferiority. Nevertheless, women have played prominent roles in Western history through and as part of the church, particularly in education and healthcare, but also as influential theologians and mystics.

Christians have made a myriad of contributions to human progress in a broad and diverse range of fields, both historically and in modern times, including the science and technology, medicine, fine arts and architecture, politics, literatures, music, philanthropy, philosophy, ethics, humanism, theatre and business. According to 100 Years of Nobel Prizes a review of Nobel prizes award between 1901 and 2000 reveals that (65.4%) of Nobel Prizes Laureates, have identified Christianity in its various forms as their religious preference. Eastern Christians (particularly Nestorian Christians) have also contributed to the Arab Islamic Civilization during the Ummayad and the Abbasid periods by translating works of Greek philosophers to Syriac and afterwards to Arabic. They also excelled in philosophy, science, theology and medicine.

Christianity contributed greatly to the development of European cultural identity, although some progress originated elsewhere Romanticism began with the curiosity and passion of the pagan world of old. Outside the Western world, Christianity has had an influence and contributed on various cultures, such as in Africa, Central Asia, the Near East, Middle East, East Asia, Southeast Asia, and the Indian subcontinent. Scholars and intellectuals agree Christians have made significant contributions to Arab and Islamic civilization since the introduction of Islam.

Common criticisms of Christianity include oppression of women, condemnation of homosexuality, colonialism, and various other cases of violence. Christian ideas have been used both to support and end slavery as an institution. Criticism of Christianity has come from the different religious and non-religious groups around the world, some of whom were themselves Christians.

Politics and law

From early persecution to state religion

The foundation of canon law is found in its earliest texts and their interpretation in the church fathers' writings. Christianity began as a Jewish sect in the mid-1st century arising out of the life and teachings of Jesus of Nazareth. The life of Jesus is recounted in the New Testament of the Bible, one of the bedrock texts of Western Civilization and inspiration for countless works of Western art. Jesus' birth is commemorated in the festival of Christmas, his death during the Paschal Triduum, and his resurrection during Easter. Christmas and Easter remain holidays in many Western nations.

Jesus learned the texts of the Hebrew Bible, with its Ten Commandments (which later became influential in Western law ) and became an influential wandering preacher. He was a persuasive teller of parables and moral philosopher who urged followers to worship God, act without violence or prejudice, and care for the sick, hungry, and poor. These teachings deeply influenced Western culture. Jesus criticized the hypocrisy of the religious establishment, which drew the ire of the authorities, who persuaded the Roman Governor of the province of Judaea, Pontius Pilate, to have him executed. The Talmud says Jesus was executed for sorcery and for leading the people into apostacy.  In Jerusalem, around 30AD, Jesus was crucified.

The early followers of Jesus, including Saints Paul and Peter carried this new theology concerning Jesus and its ethic throughout the Roman Empire and beyond, sowing the seeds for the development of the Catholic Church, of which Saint Peter is considered the first Pope. Christians sometimes faced persecution during these early centuries, particularly for their refusal to join in worshiping the emperors. Nevertheless, carried through the synagogues, merchants and missionaries across the known world, Christianity quickly grew in size and influence.  Its unique appeal was partly the result of its values and ethics.

The Bible has had a profound influence on Western civilization and on cultures around the globe; it has contributed to the formation of Western law, art, texts, and education. With a literary tradition spanning two millennia, the Bible is one of the most influential works ever written. From practices of personal hygiene to philosophy and ethics, the Bible has directly and indirectly influenced politics and law, war and peace, sexual morals, marriage and family life, toilet etiquette, letters and learning, the arts, economics, social justice, medical care and more.

Human value as a foundation to law
The world's first civilizations were Mesopotamian sacred states ruled in the name of a divinity or by rulers who were seen as divine. Rulers, and the priests, soldiers and bureaucrats who carried out their will, were a small minority who kept power by exploiting the many.

W.E.H.Lecky gives the now classical account of the sanctity of human life in his history of European morals saying Christianity "formed a new standard, higher than any which then existed in the world...".  Christian ethicist David P. Gushee says "The justice teachings of Jesus are closely related to a commitment to life's sanctity...". 
John Keown, a professor of Christian ethics distinguishes this 'sanctity of life' doctrine from "a quality of life approach, which recognizes only instrumental value in human life, and a vitalistic approach, which regards life as an absolute moral value... [Kewon says it is the] sanctity of life approach ... which embeds a presumption in favor of preserving life, but concedes that there are circumstances in which life should not be preserved at all costs", and it is this which provides the solid foundation for law concerning end of life issues.

Early legal views of women
Rome had a social caste system, with women having "no legal independence and no independent property".  Early Christianity, as Pliny the Younger explains in his letters to Emperor Trajan, had people from "every age and rank, and both sexes". Pliny reports arresting two slave women who claimed to be 'deaconesses' in the first decade of the second century.  There was a rite for the ordination of women deacons in the Roman Pontifical (a liturgical book) up through the 12th century. For women deacons, the oldest rite in the West comes from an eighth-century book, whereas Eastern rites go back to the third century and there are more of them.

The New Testament refers to a number of women in Jesus' inner circle. There are several Gospel accounts of Jesus imparting important teachings to and about women: his meeting with the Samaritan woman at the well, his anointing by Mary of Bethany, his public admiration for a poor widow who donated two copper coins to the Temple in Jerusalem, his stepping to the aid of the woman accused of adultery, his friendship with Mary and Martha the sisters of Lazarus, and the presence of Mary Magdalene, his mother, and the other women as he was crucified. Historian Geoffrey Blainey concludes that "as the standing of women was not high in Palestine, Jesus' kindnesses towards them were not always approved by those who strictly upheld tradition".

According to Christian apologist Tim Keller, it was common in the Greco-Roman world to expose female infants because of the low status of women in society. The church forbade its members to do so. Greco-Roman society saw no value in an unmarried woman, and therefore it was illegal for a widow to go more than two years without remarrying. Christianity did not force widows to marry and supported them financially. Pagan widows lost all control of their husband's estate when they remarried, but the church allowed widows to maintain their husband's estate. Christians did not believe in cohabitation. If a Christian man wanted to live with a woman, the church required marriage, and this gave women legal rights and far greater security. Finally, the pagan double standard of allowing married men to have extramarital sex and mistresses was forbidden. Jesus' teachings on divorce and Paul's advocacy of monogamy began the process of elevating the status of women so that Christian women tended to enjoy greater security and equality than women in surrounding cultures.

Laws affecting children
In the ancient world, infanticide was not legal but was rarely prosecuted. A broad distinction was popularly made between infanticide and infant exposure, which was widely practiced. Many exposed children died, but many were taken by speculators who raised them to be slaves or prostitutes.  It is not possible to ascertain, with any degree of accuracy, what diminution of infanticide resulted from legal efforts against it in the Roman empire. "It may, however, be safely asserted that the publicity of the trade in exposed children became impossible under the influence of Christianity, and that the sense of the seriousness of the crime was very considerably increased."

Legal status under Constantine
Emperor Constantine's Edict of Milan in 313 AD ended the state-sponsored persecution of Christians in the East, and his own conversion to Christianity was a significant turning point in history. In 312, Constantine offered civic toleration to Christians, and through his reign instigated laws and policies in keeping with Christian principles making Sunday the Sabbath "day of rest" for Roman society (though initially this was only for urban dwellers) and embarking on a church building program. In AD 325, Constantine conferred the First Council of Nicaea to gain consensus and unity within Christianity, with a view to establishing it as the religion of the Empire. The population and wealth of the Roman Empire had been shifting east, and around the year 330, Constantine established the city of Constantinople as a new imperial city which would be the capital of the Eastern Roman Empire. The Eastern Patriarch in Constantinople now came to rival the Pope in Rome. Although cultural continuity and interchange would continue between these Eastern and Western Roman Empires, the history of Christianity and Western culture took divergent routes, with a final Great Schism separating Roman and Eastern Christianity in 1054 AD.

Fourth century political influence and laws against pagans

During the fourth century, Christian writing and theology blossomed into a "Golden Age" of literary and scholarly activity unmatched since the days of Virgil and Horace. Many of these works remain influential in politics, law, ethics and other fields. A new genre of literature was also born in the fourth century: church history.

The remarkable transformation of Christianity from peripheral sect to major force within the Empire is often held to be a result of the influence held by St. Ambrose, the Bishop of Milan, but this is unlikely.  In April of 390, the Emperor Theodosius I ordered the punitive massacre of thousands of the citizens of Thessaloniki. In a private letter from Ambrose to Theodosius, sometime in August after this event, Ambrose told Theodosius he cannot be given communion while Theodosius is unrepentant of this terrible act. Wolf Liebeschuetz says records show "Theodosius duly complied and came to church humbly, without his imperial robes, until Christmas, when Ambrose openly readmitted him to communion."

McLynn states that "the encounter at the church door has long been known as a pious fiction." Daniel Washburn explains that the image of the mitered prelate braced in the door of the cathedral in Milan blocking Theodosius from entering, is a product of the imagination of Theodoret, a historian of the fifth century who wrote of the events of 390 "using his own ideology to fill the gaps in the historical record."  According to Peter Brown, these events concern personal piety; they do not represent a turning point in history with the State submitting to the Church.

According to Christian literature of the fourth century, paganism ended by the early to mid—fifth century with everyone either converted or cowed. Contemporary archaeology, on the other hand, indicates this is not so; paganism continued across the empire, and the end of paganism varied from place to place. Violence such as temple destructions are attested in some locations, generally in small numbers, and are not spread equally throughout the empire. In most regions away from the imperial court, the end of paganism was, more often, gradual and untraumatic.

Theodosius reigned (albeit for a brief interim) as the last Emperor of a united Eastern and Western Roman Empire. Between 389 and 391, Theodosius promulgated the Theodosian Decrees, a collection of laws from the time of Constantine including laws against heretics and pagans. In 391 Theodosius blocked the restoration of the pagan Altar of Victory to the Roman Senate and then fought against Eugenius, who courted pagan support for his own bid for the imperial throne.  Brown says the language of the Theodosian Decrees is "uniformly vehement and the penalties are harsh and frequently horrifying." They may have provided a foundation for similar laws in the High Middle Ages. However, in antiquity, these laws were not much enforced, and Brown adds that, "In most areas, polytheists were not molested, and, apart from a few ugly incidents of local violence, Jewish communities also enjoyed a century of stable, even privileged, existence."  Contemporary scholars indicate pagans were not wiped out or fully converted by the fifth century as Christian sources claim. Pagans remained throughout the fourth and fifth centuries in sufficient numbers to preserve a broad spectrum of pagan practices into the 6th century and even beyond in some places.

The political and legal impact of the fall of Rome
The central bureaucracy of imperial Rome remained in Rome in the sixth century but was replaced in the rest of the empire by German tribal organization and the church. After the fall of Rome (476) most of the west returned to a subsistence agrarian form of life. What little security there was in this world was largely provided by the Christian church.  The papacy served as a source of authority and continuity at this critical time. In the absence of a magister militum living in Rome, even the control of military matters fell to the pope.

The role of Christianity in politics and law in the Medieval period
The historian Geoffrey Blainey likened the Catholic Church in its activities during the Middle Ages to an early version of a welfare state: "It conducted hospitals for the old and orphanages for the young; hospices for the sick of all ages; places for the lepers; and hostels or inns where pilgrims could buy a cheap bed and meal". It supplied food to the population during famine and distributed food to the poor. This welfare system the church funded through collecting taxes on a large scale and by owning large farmlands and estates. The canon law of the Catholic Church is the system of laws and legal principles made and enforced by the hierarchical authorities of the Church to regulate its external organization and government and to order and direct the activities of Catholics toward the mission of the Church. It was the first modern Western legal system and is the oldest continuously functioning legal system in the West, predating the European common law and civil law traditions.

The Rule of Benedict as a legal base in the Dark Ages
The period between the Fall of Rome (476 C.E.) and the rise of the Carolingian Franks (750 C.E.) is often referred to as the "Dark Ages", however, it could also be designated the "Age of the Monk". This era had a lasting impact on politics and law through Christian aesthetes like St. Benedict (480–543), who vowed a life of chastity, obedience and poverty; after rigorous intellectual training and self-denial, Benedictines lived by the "Rule of Benedict:" work and pray.  This "Rule" became the foundation of the majority of the thousands of monasteries that spread across what is modern day Europe; "...certainly there will be no demur in recognizing that St. Benedict's Rule has been one of the great facts in the history of western Europe, and that its influence and effects are with us to this day."

Monasteries were models of productivity and economic resourcefulness teaching their local communities animal husbandry, cheese making, wine making, and various other skills. They were havens for the poor, hospitals, hospices for the dying, and schools. Medical practice was highly important in medieval monasteries, and they are best known for their contributions to medical tradition. They also made advances in sciences such as astronomy.  For centuries, nearly all secular leaders were trained by monks because, excepting private tutors who were still, often, monks, it was the only education available.

The formation of these organized bodies of believers distinct from political and familial authority, especially for women, gradually carved out a series of social spaces with some amount of independence thereby revolutionizing social history.

Gregory the Great (c 540–604) administered the church with strict reform. A trained Roman lawyer, administrator, and monk, he represents the shift from the classical to the medieval outlook and was a father of many of the structures of the later Catholic Church. According to the Catholic Encyclopedia, he looked upon Church and State as co-operating to form a united whole, which acted in two distinct spheres, ecclesiastical and secular, but by the time of his death, the papacy was the great power in Italy:  Gregory was one of the few sovereigns called Great by universal consent. He is known for sending out the first recorded large-scale mission from Rome to convert the then-pagan Anglo-Saxons in England, for his many writings, his administrative skills, and his focus on the welfare of the people.  He also fought the Arian heresy and the Donatists, pacified the Goths, left a famous example of penitence for a crime, revised the liturgy, and influenced music through the development of antiphonal chants.

Charlemagne transformed law and founded feudalism in the Early Middle Ages

Charlemagne ("Charles the Great" in English) became king of the Franks in 768. He conquered the Low Countries, Saxony, and northern and central Italy, and in 800, Pope Leo III crowned Charlemagne Holy Roman Emperor. Sometimes called the "Father of Europe" and the founder of feudalism, Charlemagne instituted political and judicial reform and led what is sometimes referred to as the Early Renaissance or the Christian Renaissance.  Johannes Fried writes that Charlemagne left such a profound impression on his age that traces of it still remain. He promoted education and literacy and subsidized schools, he worked at protecting the poor enacting economic and currency reform; these, along with legal and judicial reforms, created a more lawful and prosperous kingdom. This helped form a group of independent minded warlords into a well-administered empire, with a tradition of working with the Pope, which became the precursor to the nation of France.  Fried says, "he was the first king and emperor to seriously enact the legal principle according to which the Pope was beyond the reach of all human justice—a decision that would have major ramifications in the future."

Modern common law, persecution, and secularization began in the High Middle Ages

By the late 11th century, beginning with the efforts of Pope Gregory VII, the Church successfully established itself as "an autonomous legal and political ... [entity] within Western Christendom".For the next three hundred years, the Church held great influence over Western society; church laws were the single "universal law ... common to jurisdictions and peoples throughout Europe." With its own court system, the Church retained jurisdiction over many aspects of ordinary life, including education, inheritance, oral promises, oaths, moral crimes, and marriage. As one of the more powerful institutions of the Middle Ages, Church attitudes were reflected in many secular laws of the time.  The Catholic Church was very powerful, essentially internationalist and democratic in it structures, with its many branches run by the different monastic organizations, each with its own distinct theology and often in disagreement with the others.

Men of a scholarly bent usually took Holy Orders and frequently joined religious institutes. Those with intellectual, administrative, or diplomatic skill could advance beyond the usual restraints of society. Leading churchmen from faraway lands were accepted in local bishoprics, linking European thought across wide distances. Complexes like the Abbey of Cluny became vibrant centres with dependencies spread throughout Europe. Ordinary people also trekked vast distances on pilgrimages to express their piety and pray at the site of holy relics.

In the pivotal twelfth century (1100s), Europe began laying the foundation for its gradual transformation from the medieval to the modern. Feudal lords slowly lost power to the feudal kings as kings began centralizing power into themselves and their nation-state. Kings built their own armies instead of relying on their vassals, thereby taking power from the nobility. The 'state' took over legal practices that had traditionally belonged to local nobles and local church officials; and they began to target minorities.  According to R.I. Moore and other contemporary scholars, "the growth of secular power and the pursuit of secular interests, constituted the essential context of the developments that led to a persecuting society." This has had a permanent impact on politics and law in multiple ways: through a new rhetoric of exclusion that legitimized persecution based on new attitudes of stereotyping, stigmatization and even demonization of the accused; by the creation of new civil laws which included allowing the state to be the defendant and bring charges on its own behalf; the invention of police forces as the arm of state enforcement; the invention of a general taxation, gold coins, and modern banking to pay for it all; and the inquisitions, which were a new legal procedure that allowed the judge to investigate on his own initiative without requiring a victim (other than the state) to press charges.

"The exceptional character of persecution in the Latin west since the twelfth century has lain not in the scale or savagery of particular persecutions, ... but in its capacity for sustained long-term growth. The patterns, procedures and rhetoric of persecution, which were established in the twelfth century, have given it the power of infinite and indefinite self-generation and self-renewal."

Eventually, this would lead to the development among the early Protestants of the conviction that concepts of religious toleration and separation of church and state were essential.

Canon law, the value of debate, and natural law from medieval universities
Christianity in the High Middle Ages had a lasting impact on politics and law through the newly established universities. Canon law emerged from theology and developed independently there. By the 1200s, both civil and canon law had become a major aspect of ecclesiastical culture, dominating Christian thought.  Most bishops and Popes of this period were trained lawyers rather than theologians, and much Christian thought of this time became little more than an extension of law.  In the High Middle Ages, the religion that had begun by decrying the power of law (Romans 7:1) developed the most complex religious law the world has ever seen. Canon law became a fertile field for those who advocated strong papal power, and Brian Downing says that a church-centered empire almost became a reality in this era.  However, Downing says the rule of law, established in the Middle Ages, is one of the reasons why Europe eventually developed democracy instead.

Medieval universities were not secular institutions, but they, and some religious orders, were founded with a respect for dialogue and debate, believing good understanding came from viewing something from multiple sides.  Because of this, they incorporated reasoned disputation into their system of studies.  Accordingly, the universities would hold what was called a quadlibettal where a 'master' would raise a question, students would provide arguments, and those arguments would be assessed and argued. Brian Law says, "Literally anyone could attend, masters and scholars from other schools, all kinds of ecclesiastics and prelates and even civil authorities, all the 'intellectuals' of the time, who were always attracted to skirmishes of this kind, and all of whom had the right to ask questions and oppose arguments." In a kind of 'Town Hall Meeting' atmosphere, questions could be raised orally by anyone (a quolibet) about literally anything (de quolibet).
 
Thomas Aquinas was a master at the University of Paris, twice, and held quodlibetals. Aquinas interpreted Aristotle on natural law. Alexander Passerin d'Entreves writes that natural law has been assailed for a century and a half, yet it remains an aspect of legal philosophy since much human rights theory is based on it. Aquinas taught that just leadership must work for the "common good". He defines a law as "an ordinance of reason" and that it can't simply be the will of the legislator and be good law. Aquinas says the primary goal of law is that "good is to be done and pursued and evil avoided."

Natural law and human rights
"The philosophical foundation of the liberal concept of human rights can be found in natural law theories", and much thinking on natural law is traced to the thought of the Dominican friar, Thomas Aquinas. Aquinas continues to influence the works of leading political and legal philosophers.

According to Aquinas, every law is ultimately derived from what he calls the 'eternal law': God's ordering of all created things. For Aquinas, a human action is good or bad depending on whether it conforms to reason, and it is this participation in the 'eternal law' by the 'rational creature' that is called 'natural law'. Aquinas said natural law is a fundamental principle that is woven into the fabric of human nature. Secularists, such as Hugo Grotius, later expanded the idea of human rights and built on it.

"...one cannot and need not deny that Human Rights are of Western Origin. It cannot be denied, because they are morally based on the Judeo-Christian tradition and Graeco-Roman philosophy; they were codified in the West over many centuries, they have secured an established position in the national declarations of western democracies, and they have been enshrined in the constitutions of those democracies." 
 
Howard Tumber says, "human rights is not a universal doctrine, but is the descendent of one particular religion (Christianity)."  This does not suggest Christianity has been superior in its practice or has not had "its share of human rights abuses".

David Gushee says Christianity has a "tragically mixed legacy" when it comes to the application of its own ethics.  He examines three cases of "Christendom divided against itself": the crusades and St. Francis' attempt at peacemaking with Muslims; Spanish conquerors and the killing of indigenous peoples and the protests against it; and the on-again off-again persecution and protection of Jews.

Charles Malik, a Lebanese academic, diplomat, philosopher and theologian was responsible for the drafting and adoption of the 1948 Universal Declaration of Human Rights.

Revival of Roman law in the Medieval Inquisition

According to Jennifer Deane, the label Inquisition implies "an institutional coherence and an official unity that never existed in the Middle Ages."  The Medieval Inquisitions were actually a series of separate inquisitions beginning from around 1184 lasting to the 1230s that were in response to dissidents accused of heresy, while the Papal Inquisition (1230s–1302) was created to restore order disrupted by mob violence against heretics. Heresy was a religious, political, and social issue.  As such, "the first stirrings of violence against dissidents were usually the result of popular resentment." This led to a breakdown of social order. In the Late Roman Empire, an inquisitorial system of justice had developed, and that is the system that was revived in the Middle Ages.  It used a combined panel of both civil and ecclesiastical representatives with a Bishop, his representative, or a local judge, as inquisitor. Essentially, the church reintroduced Roman law in Europe (in the form of the Inquisition) when it seemed that Germanic law had failed.  "The [Medieval] Inquisition was not an organization arbitrarily devised and imposed upon the judicial system by the ambition or fanaticism of the church. It was rather a natural—one may almost say an inevitable—evolution of the forces at work in the thirteenth century."

The invention of Holy War, chivalry, and the roots of modern tolerance
In 1095, Pope Urban II called for a Crusade to re-take the Holy Land from Muslim rule.  Hugh S. Pyper says "the city [of Jerusalem's] importance is reflected in the fact that early medieval maps place [Jerusalem] at the center of the world." "By the eleventh century, the Seljuk Turks had conquered [three—quarters of the Christian world]. The holdings of the old Eastern Roman Empire, known to modern historians as the Byzantine Empire, were reduced to little more than Greece. In desperation, the emperor in Constantinople sent word to the Christians of western Europe asking them to aid their brothers and sisters in the East."  This was the impetus of the first crusade, however, the "Colossus of the Medieval world was Islam, not Christendom" and despite initial success, these conflicts, which lasted four centuries, ultimately ended in failure for western Christendom.

At the time of the First crusade, there was no clear concept of what a crusade was beyond that of a pilgrimage. Riley-Smith says the crusades were products of the renewed spirituality of the central Middle Ages as much as they were of political circumstances.  Senior churchmen of this time presented the concept of Christian love to the faithful as the reason to take up arms.  The people had a concern for living the vita apostolica and expressing Christian ideals in active works of charity, exemplified by the new hospitals, the pastoral work of the Augustinians and Premonstratensians, and the service of the friars.  Riley-Smith concludes, "The charity of St. Francis may now appeal to us more than that of the crusaders, but both sprang from the same roots."  Constable adds that those "scholars who see the crusades as the beginning of European colonialism and expansionism would have surprised people at the time. [Crusaders] would not have denied some selfish aspects... but the predominant emphasis was on the defense and recovery of lands that had once been Christian and on the self-sacrifice, rather than the self-seeking, of the participants." Riley-Smith also says scholars are turning away from the idea the crusades were materially motivated.

Ideas such as holy war and Christian chivalry, in both thought and culture, continued to evolve gradually from the eleventh to the thirteenth centuries.  This can be traced in expressions of law, traditions, tales, prophecy, and historical narratives, in letters, bulls and poems written during the crusading period.

According to political science professor Andrew R. Murphy, concepts of tolerance and intolerance were not starting points for thoughts about relations for any of the various groups involved in or affected by the crusades. Instead, concepts of tolerance began to grow during the crusades from efforts to define legal limits and the nature of co-existence. Eventually, this would help provide the foundation to the conviction among the early Protestants that pioneering the concept of religious toleration was necessary.

Moral decline and rising political power of the church in the Late Middle Ages
During the "calamitous" fourteenth century with its plague, famine and wars, people were thrown into confusion and despair. From its pinnacle of power in the 1200s, the church entered a period of decline, internal conflict, and corruption. According to Walter Ullmann, the church lost "the moral, spiritual and authoritative leadership it had built up in Europe over the centuries of minute, consistent, detailed, dynamic forward-looking work. ...The papacy was now forced to pursue policies which, in substance, aimed at appeasement and were no longer directive, orientating and determinative."

According to Matthews and DeWitt, "The Popes in the fourteenth to the mid-fifteenth century turned their interest to the arts and humanities rather than to pressing moral and spiritual issues.  Moreover, they were vitally concerned with the trappings of political power. They plunged into Italian politics...ruling as secular princes in their papal lands. Their worldly interests and blatant political maneuverings only intensified the mounting disapproval of the papacy and provided the church's critics with more examples of the institution's corruption and decline." As the Church grew more powerful, wealthy, and corrupt, many sought reform. The Dominican and Franciscan Orders were founded, which emphasized poverty and spirituality, and the concept of lay piety developed—the Devotio Moderna or the new devotion—which worked toward the ideal of a pious society of ordinary non-ordained people and, ultimately, to the Reformation and the development of modern concepts of tolerance and religious freedom.

Political power of Women rose and fell
In the 13th-century Roman Pontifical, the prayer for ordaining women as deacons was removed, and ordination was re-defined and applied only to male Priests.

Woman-as-witch became a stereotype in the 1400s until it was codified in 1487 by Pope Innocent VIII who declared "most witches are female". "The European witch stereotype embodies two apparent paradoxes: first, it was not produced by the 'barbaric Dark Ages', but during the progressive Renaissance and the early modern period; secondly, Western Christianity did not recognize the reality of witches for centuries, or criminalize them until around 1400." Sociologist Don Swenson says the explanation for this may lay in the nature of Medieval society as heirocratic which led to violence and the use of coercion to force conformity. "There has been much debate ...as to how many women were executed...[and estimates vary wildly, but numbers] small and large do little to portray the horror and dishonor inflicted upon these women. This treatment provides [dramatic] contrast to the respect given to women during the early era of Christianity and in early Europe ..."

Women were in many respects excluded from political and mercantile life; however, some leading churchwomen were exceptions. Medieval abbesses and female superiors of monastic houses were powerful figures whose influence could rival that of male bishops and abbots: "They treated with kings, bishops, and the greatest lords on terms of perfect equality; ... they were present at all great religious and national solemnities, at the dedication of churches, and even, like the queens, took part in the deliberation of the national assemblies ...". The increasing popularity of devotion to the Virgin Mary (the mother of Jesus) secured maternal virtue as a central cultural theme of Catholic Europe. Kenneth Clarke wrote that the 'Cult of the Virgin' in the early 12th century "had taught a race of tough and ruthless barbarians the virtues of tenderness and compassion".

The political Popes
In 1054, after centuries of strained relations, the Great Schism occurred over differences in doctrine, splitting the Christian world between the Catholic Church, centered in Rome and dominant in the West, and the Eastern Orthodox Church, centered in Constantinople, capital of the Byzantine Empire.

Relations between the major powers in Western society: the nobility, monarchy and clergy, also sometimes produced conflict. For example, the Investiture Controversy was one of the most significant conflicts between Church and state in medieval Europe. A series of Popes challenged the authority of monarchies over control of appointments, or investitures, of church officials. The Court of Holy Roman Emperor Frederick II, based in Sicily, experienced tension and rivalry with the Papacy over control of Northern Italy.

In 1302, Pope Boniface VIII (1294–1303) issued Unam sanctam, a papal bull proclaiming the superiority of the Pope over all secular rulers. Philip IV of France responded by sending an army to arrest the Pope. Boniface fled for his life and died shortly thereafter. "This episode revealed that the popes were no longer a match for the feudal kings" and showed there had been a marked decline in papal prestige.  George Garnett says the implementation of the papal monarchial idea had led to the loss of prestige, as, the more efficient the papal bureaucratic machine became, the further it alienated the people, and the further it declined.

The Papacy had its court at Avignon from 1305 to 1378 This arose from the conflict between the Italian Papacy and the French crown.  Theologian Roger Olson says the church reached its nadir at this time when there were three different men claiming to be the rightful Pope.  "What the observer of the papacy witnessed in the second half of the thirteenth century was a gradual, though clearly perceptible, decomposition of Europe as a single ecclesiastical unit, and the fragmentation of Europe into independent, autonomous entities which were soon to be called national monarchies or states.  This fragmentation heralded the withering away of the papacy as a governing institution operating on a universal scale."

The political and legal power of the state through Modern Inquisitions
The history of the Inquisition divides into two major parts: "its creation by the medieval papacy in the early thirteenth century, and its transformation between 1478 and 1542 into permanent secular governmental bureaucracies: the Spanish, Portuguese, and Roman Inquisitions...all of which endured into the nineteenth century."  The old medieval inquisitions had limited power and influence, whereas the powers of the modern "Holy Tribunal" were extended and enlarged by the power of the state into "one of the most formidable engines of destruction which ever existed."

Historian Helen Rawlings says, "the Spanish Inquisition was different [from earlier inquisitions] in one fundamental respect: it was responsible to the crown rather than the Pope and was used to consolidate state interest."  It was authorized by the Pope, yet the initial Inquisitors proved so severe that the Pope almost immediately opposed it to no avail.  Early in 1483, the king and queen established a council, the Consejo de la Suprema y General Inquisición,  to govern the inquisition and chose Torquemada to head it as inquisitor general.  In October 1483, a papal bull conceded control to the crown.  According to José Cassanova, the Spanish inquisition became the first truly national, unified and centralized state institution. After the 1400s, few Spanish inquisitors were from the religious orders.

The Portuguese inquisition was also fully controlled by the crown which established a government board, known as the General Council, to oversee it. The Grand Inquisitor, who was chosen by the king, was always a member of the royal family.  The first statute of Limpieza de sangre (purity of blood) appeared in Toledo in 1449 and was later adopted in Portugal as well. Initially, these statutes were condemned by the Church, but in 1555, the highly corrupt Pope Alexander VI approved a 'blood purity' statute for one of the religious orders. In his history of the Portuguese inquisition, Giuseppe Marcocci says there is a deep connection between the rise of the Felipes in Portugal, the growth of the inquisition, and the adoption of the statutes of purity of blood which spread and increased and were more concerned with ethnic ancestry than religion.

Historian T. F. Mayer writes that "the Roman Inquisition operated to serve the papacy's long standing political aims in Naples, Venice and Florence."  Under Paul III and his successor Julius III, and under most of the popes thereafter, the Roman Inquisition's activity was relatively restrained and its command structure was considerably more bureaucratic than those of other inquisitions were.  Where the medieval Inquisition had focused on popular misconceptions which resulted in the disturbance of public order, the Roman Inquisition was concerned with orthodoxy of a more intellectual, academic nature.  The Roman Inquisition is probably best known for its condemnation of the difficult and cantankerous Galileo which was more about "bringing Florence to heel" than about heresy.

The role of Christianity in politics and law from the Reformation until the Modern era

In the Middle Ages, the Church and the worldly authorities were closely related. Martin Luther separated the religious and the worldly realms in principle (doctrine of the two kingdoms). The believers were obliged to use reason to govern the worldly sphere in an orderly and peaceful way. Luther's doctrine of the priesthood of all believers upgraded the role of laymen in the church considerably. The members of a congregation had the right to elect a minister and, if necessary, to vote for his dismissal (Treatise On the right and authority of a Christian assembly or congregation to judge all doctrines and to call, install and dismiss teachers, as testified in Scripture; 1523). Calvin strengthened this basically democratic approach by including elected laymen (church elders, presbyters) in his representative church government. The Huguenots added regional synods and a national synod, whose members were elected by the congregations, to Calvin's system of church self-government. This system was taken over by the other Reformed churches.

Politically, John Calvin favoured a mixture of aristocracy and democracy. He appreciated the advantages of democracy: "It is an invaluable gift, if God allows a people to freely elect its own authorities and overlords." Calvin also thought that earthly rulers lose their divine right and must be put down when they rise up against God. To further protect the rights of ordinary people, Calvin suggested separating political powers in a system of checks and balances (separation of powers). 16th-century Calvinists and Lutherans developed a theory of resistance called the doctrine of the lesser magistrate which was later employed in the U.S. Declaration of Independence. Thus early Protestants resisted political absolutism and paved the way for the rise of modern democracy. Besides England, the Netherlands were, under Calvinist leadership, the freest country in Europe in the seventeenth and eighteenth centuries. It granted asylum to philosophers like René Descartes, Baruch Spinoza and Pierre Bayle. Hugo Grotius was able to teach his natural-law theory and a relatively liberal interpretation of the Bible.

Consistent with Calvin's political ideas, Protestants created both the English and the American democracies. In 17th-century England, the most important persons and events in this process were the English Civil War, Oliver Cromwell, John Milton, John Locke, the Glorious Revolution, the English Bill of Rights, and the Act of Settlement. Later, the British took their democratic ideals also to their colonies, e.g. Australia, New Zealand, and India. In the 19th and 20th centuries, the British variety of modern-time democracy, constitutional monarchy, was taken over by Protestant-formed Sweden, Norway, Denmark, and the Netherlands as well as the Catholic countries Belgium and Spain. In North America, Plymouth Colony (Pilgrim Fathers; 1620) and Massachusetts Bay Colony (1628) practised democratic self-rule and separation of powers. These Congregationalists were convinced that the democratic form of government was the will of God. The Mayflower Compact was a social contract.

Sexual morals
Classics scholar Kyle Harper says 

Both the ancient Greeks and the Romans cared and wrote about sexual morality within categories of good and bad, pure and defiled, and ideal and transgression. But the sexual ethical structures of Roman society were built on status, and sexual modesty meant something different for men than it did for women, and for the well-born, than it did for the poor, and for the free citizen, than it did for the slave—for whom the concepts of honor, shame and sexual modesty could be said to have no meaning at all. Slaves were not thought to have an interior ethical life because they could go no lower socially and were commonly used sexually; the free and well born were thought to embody social honor and were therefore able to exhibit the fine sense of shame suited to their station.  Roman literature indicates the Romans were aware of these dualities.

Shame was a profoundly social concept that was, in ancient Rome, always mediated by gender and status. "It was not enough that a wife merely regulate her sexual behavior in the accepted ways; it was required that her virtue in this area be conspicuous."  Men, on the other hand, were allowed live-in mistresses called pallake. This permitted Roman society to find both a husband's control of a wife's sexual behavior a matter of intense importance and at the same time see his own sex with young boys as of little concern.  Christianity sought to establish equal sexual standards for men and women and to protect all the young whether slave or free. This was a transformation in the deep logic of sexual morality.

Early Church Fathers advocated against adultery, polygamy, homosexuality, pederasty, bestiality, prostitution, and incest while advocating for the sanctity of the marriage bed. The central Christian prohibition against such porneia, which is a single name for that array of sexual behaviors, "collided with deeply entrenched patterns of Roman permissiveness where the legitimacy of sexual contact was determined primarily by status. St. Paul, whose views became dominant in early Christianity, made the body into a consecrated space, a point of mediation between the individual and the divine. Paul's over-riding sense that gender—rather than status or power or wealth or position—was the prime determinant in the propriety of the sex act was momentous. By boiling the sex act down to the most basic constituents of male and female, Paul was able to describe the sexual culture surrounding him in transformative terms."

Christian sexual ideology is inextricable from its concept of freewill. "In its original form, Christian freewill was a cosmological claim—an argument about the relationship between God's justice and the individual... as Christianity became intermeshed with society, the discussion shifted in revealing ways to the actual psychology of volition and the material constraints on sexual action... The church's acute concern with volition places Christian philosophy in the liveliest currents of imperial Greco-Roman philosophy [where] orthodox Christians offered a radically distinctive version of it." The Greeks and Romans said our deepest moralities depend on our social position which is given to us by fate.  Christianity "preached a liberating message of freedom. It was a revolution in the rules of behavior, but also in the very image of the human being as a sexual being, free, frail and awesomely responsible for one's own self to God alone.  It was a revolution in the nature of society's claims on the moral agent... There are risks in over-estimating the change in old patterns Christianity was able to begin bringing about; but there are risks, too, in underestimating Christianization as a watershed."

Marriage and family life

The teachings of the Church have also been used to "establish[...] the status of women under the law". There has been some debate as to whether the Church has improved the status of women or hindered their progress.

From the beginning of the thirteenth century, the Church formally recognized marriage between a freely consenting, baptized man and woman as a sacrament—an outward sign communicating a special gift of God's love. The Council of Florence in 1438 gave this definition, following earlier Church statements in 1208, and declared that sexual union was a special participation in the union of Christ in the Church. However, the Puritans, while highly valuing the institution, viewed marriage as a "civil", rather than a "religious" matter, being "under the jurisdiction of the civil courts". This is because they found no biblical precedent for clergy performing marriage ceremonies. Further, marriage was said to be for the "relief of concupiscence" as well as any spiritual purpose. During the Protestant Reformation, Martin Luther and John Calvin denied the sacramentality of marriage. This unanimity was broken at the 1930 Lambeth Conference, the quadrennial meeting of the worldwide Anglican Communion—creating divisions in that denomination.

Catholicism equates premarital sex with fornication and ties it with breaking the sixth commandment ("Thou shalt not commit adultery") in its Catechism. While sex before marriage was not a taboo in the Anglican Church until the "Hardwicke Marriage Act of 1753, which for the first time stipulated that everyone in England and Wales had to be married in their parish church" Prior to that time, "marriage began at the time of betrothal, when couples would live and sleep together... The process begun at the time of the Hardwicke Act continued throughout the 1800s, with stigma beginning to attach to illegitimacy."

Scriptures in the New Testament dealing with sexuality are extensive. Subjects include: the Apostolic Decree, sexual immorality, divine love, mutual self-giving, bodily membership between Christ and between husband and wife and honor versus dishonor of adultery.

The Hebrew Bible and its traditional interpretations in Judaism and Christianity have historically affirmed and endorsed a patriarchal and heteronormative approach towards human sexuality, favouring exclusively penetrative vaginal intercourse between men and women within the boundaries of marriage over all other forms of human sexual activity, including autoeroticism, masturbation, oral sex, non-penetrative and non-heterosexual sexual intercourse (all of which have been labeled as "sodomy" at various times). They have believed and taught that such behaviors are forbidden because they are considered sinful, and further compared to or derived from the behavior of the alleged residents of Sodom and Gomorrah.

Roman Empire
Social structures before and at the dawn of Christianity in the Roman Empire held that women were inferior to men intellectually and physically and were "naturally dependent". Athenian women were legally classified as children regardless of age and were the "legal property of some man at all stages in her life." Women in the Roman Empire had limited legal rights and could not enter professions. Female infanticide and abortion were practiced by all classes. In family life, men could have "lovers, prostitutes and concubines" but wives who engaged in extramarital affairs were considered guilty of adultery. It was not rare for pagan women to be married before the age of puberty and then forced to consummate the marriage with her often much older husband. Husbands could divorce their wives at any time simply by telling the wife to leave; wives did not have a similar ability to divorce their husbands.

Early Church Fathers advocated against polygamy, abortion, infanticide, child abuse, homosexuality, transvestism, and incest. Although some Christian ideals were adopted by the Roman Empire, there is little evidence to link most of these laws to Church influence. After the Roman Empire adopted Christianity as the official religion, however, the link between Christian teachings and Roman family laws became more clear.

For example, Church teaching heavily influenced the legal concept of marriage. During the Gregorian Reform, the Church developed and codified a view of marriage as a sacrament. In a departure from societal norms, Church law required the consent of both parties before a marriage could be performed and established a minimum age for marriage. The elevation of marriage to a sacrament also made the union a binding contract, with dissolutions overseen by Church authorities. Although the Church abandoned tradition to allow women the same rights as men to dissolve a marriage, in practice, when an accusation of infidelity was made, men were granted dissolutions more frequently than women.

Medieval period
According to historian Shulamith Shahar, "[s]ome historians hold that the Church played a considerable part in fostering the inferior status of women in medieval society in general" by providing a "moral justification" for male superiority and by accepting practices such as wife-beating. "The ecclesiastical conception of the inferior status of women, deriving from Creation, her role in Original Sin and her subjugation to man, provided both direct and indirect justification for her inferior standing in the family and in society in medieval civilization. It was not the Church which induced husbands to beat their wives, but it not only accepted this custom after the event, if it was not carried to excess, but, by proclaiming the superiority of man, also supplied its moral justification."  Despite these laws, some women, particularly abbesses, gained powers that were never available to women in previous Roman or Germanic societies.

Although these teachings emboldened secular authorities to give women fewer rights than men, they also helped form the concept of chivalry. Chivalry was influenced by a new Church attitude towards Mary, the mother of Jesus. This "ambivalence about women's very nature" was shared by most major religions in the Western world.

Family relations 

Christian culture puts notable emphasis on the family, and according to the work of scholars Max Weber, Alan Macfarlane, Steven Ozment, Jack Goody and Peter Laslett, the huge transformation that led to modern marriage in Western democracies was "fueled by the religio-cultural value system provided by elements of Judaism, early Christianity, Roman Catholic canon law and the Protestant Reformation". Historically, extended families were the basic family unit in the Catholic culture and countries. According to a study by the scholar Joseph Henrich from Harvard University, the Catholic church "changed extended family ties, as well as values and psychology of individuals in the Western world".

Most Christian denominations practice infant baptism to enter children into the faith. Some form of confirmation ritual occurs when the child has reached the age of reason and voluntarily accepts the religion. Ritual circumcision is used to mark Coptic Christian, Ethiopian Orthodox Christian and Eritrean Orthodox infant males as belonging to the faith. Circumcision is practiced among many Christian countries and communities; Christian communities in Africa, the Anglosphere countries, the Philippines, the Middle East, South Korea and Oceania have high circumcision rates, while Christian communities in Europe and South America have low circumcision rates.

During the early period of capitalism, the rise of a large, commercial middle class, mainly in the Protestant countries of Holland and England, brought about a new family ideology centred around the upbringing of children. Puritanism stressed the importance of individual salvation and concern for the spiritual welfare of children. It became widely recognized that children possess rights on their own behalf. This included the rights of poor children to sustenance, membership in a community, education, and job training. The Poor Relief Acts in Elizabethan England put responsibility on each Parish to care for all the poor children in the area. And prior to the 20th century, three major branches of Christianity—Catholicism, Orthodoxy and Protestantism—as well as leading Protestant reformers Martin Luther and John Calvin generally held a critical perspective of birth control.

The Church of Jesus Christ of Latter-day Saints puts notable emphasis on the family, and the distinctive concept of a united family which lives and progresses forever is at the core of Latter-day Saint doctrine. Church members are encouraged to marry and have children, and as a result, Latter-day Saint families tend to be larger than average. All sexual activity outside of marriage is considered a serious sin. All homosexual activity is considered sinful and same-sex marriages are not performed or supported by the LDS Church. Latter-day Saint fathers who hold the priesthood typically name and bless their children shortly after birth to formally give the child a name and generate a church record for them. Mormons tend to be very family-oriented and have strong connections across generations and with extended family, reflective of their belief that families can be sealed together beyond death. In the temple, husbands and wives are sealed to each other for eternity. The implication is that other institutional forms, including the church, might disappear, but the family will endure. A 2011 survey of Mormons in the United States showed that family life is very important to Mormons, with family concerns significantly higher than career concerns. Four out of five Mormons believe that being a good parent is one of the most important goals in life, and roughly three out of four Mormons put having a successful marriage in this category. Mormons also have a strict law of chastity, requiring abstention from sexual relations outside heterosexual marriage and fidelity within marriage.

A Pew Center study about Religion and Living arrangements around the world in 2019, found that Christians around the world live in somewhat smaller households, on average, than non-Christians (4.5 vs. 5.1 members). 34% of world's Christian population live in two parent families with minor children, while 29% live in household with extended families, 11% live as couples without other family members, 9% live in household with least one child over the age of 18 with one or two parents, 7% live alone, and 6% live in single parent households. Christians in Asia and Pacific, Latin America and the Caribbean, Middle East and North Africa, and in Sub-Saharan Africa, overwhelmingly live in extended or two parent families with minor children. While more Christians in Europe and North America live alone or as couples without other family members.

Clerical marriage 

Clerical marriage is admitted among Protestants, including both Anglicans and Lutherans. Some Protestant clergy and their children have played an essential role in literature, philosophy, science, and education in Early Modern Europe.

Many Eastern Churches (Assyrian Church of the East, Eastern Orthodox, Oriental Orthodox, or Eastern Catholic), while allowing married men to be ordained, do not allow clerical marriage after ordination: their parish priests are often married, but must marry before being ordained to the priesthood. Within the lands of the Eastern Christendom, priests' children often became priests and married within their social group, establishing a tightly-knit hereditary caste among some Eastern Christian communities.

The Catholic Church not only forbids clerical marriage, but generally follows a practice of clerical celibacy, requiring candidates for ordination to be unmarried or widowed. However, this public policy in the Catholic Church has not always been enforced in private.

Slavery

The Church initially accepted slavery as part of the Greco-Roman social fabric of society, campaigning primarily for humane treatment of slaves but also admonishing slaves to behave appropriately towards their masters. Historian Glenn Sunshine says, "Christians were the first people in history to oppose slavery systematically. Early Christians purchased slaves in the markets simply to set them free.  Later, in the seventh century, the Franks..., under the influence of its Christian queen, Bathilde, became the first kingdom in history to begin the process of outlawing slavery. ...In the 1200s, Thomas Aquinas declared slavery a sin. When the African slave trade began in the 1400s, it was condemned numerous times by the papacy."

During the early medieval period, Christians tolerated enslavement of non-Christians. By the end of the Medieval period, enslavement of Christians had been mitigated somewhat with the spread of serfdom within Europe, though outright slavery existed in European colonies in other parts of the world. Several popes issued papal bulls condemning mistreatment of enslaved Native Americans; these were largely ignored. In his 1839 bull In supremo apostolatus, Pope Gregory XVI condemned all forms of slavery; nevertheless some American bishops continued to support slavery for several decades. In this historic Bull, Pope Gregory outlined his summation of the impact of the Church on the ancient institution of slavery, beginning by acknowledging that early Apostles had tolerated slavery but had called on masters to "act well towards their slaves... knowing that the common Master both of themselves and of the slaves is in Heaven, and that with Him there is no distinction of persons". Gregory continued to discuss the involvement of Christians for and against slavery through the ages:

Latin America

It was women, primarily Amerindian Christian converts who became the primary supporters of the Latin American Church. While the Spanish military was known for its ill-treatment of Amerindian men and women, Catholic missionaries are credited with championing all efforts to initiate protective laws for the Indians and fought against their enslavement. This began within 20 years of the discovery of the New World by Europeans in 1492 in December 1511, Antonio de Montesinos, a Dominican friar, openly rebuked the Spanish rulers of Hispaniola for their "cruelty and tyranny" in dealing with the American natives. King Ferdinand enacted the Laws of Burgos and Valladolid in response. The issue resulted in a crisis of conscience in 16th-century Spain.  Further abuses against the Amerindians committed by Spanish authorities were denounced by Catholic missionaries such as Bartolomé de Las Casas and Francisco de Vitoria which led to debate on the nature of human rights and the birth of modern international law. Enforcement of these laws was lax, and some historians blame the Church for not doing enough to liberate the Indians; others point to the Church as the only voice raised on behalf of indigenous peoples.

Slavery and human sacrifice were both part of Latin American culture before the Europeans arrived. Indian slavery was first abolished by Pope Paul III in the 1537 bull Sublimis Deus which confirmed that "their souls were as immortal as those of Europeans", that Indians were to be regarded as fully human, and they should neither be robbed nor turned into slaves.  While these edicts may have had some beneficial effects, these were limited in scope. European colonies were mainly run by military and royally-appointed administrators, who seldom stopped to consider church teachings when forming policy or enforcing their rule. Even after independence, institutionalized prejudice and injustice toward indigenous people continued well into the twentieth century. This has led to the formation of a number of movements to reassert indigenous peoples' civil rights and culture in modern nation-states.

A catastrophe was wrought upon the Amerindians by contact with Europeans. Old World diseases like smallpox, measles, malaria and many others spread through Indian populations. "In most of the New World 90 percent or more of the native population was destroyed by wave after wave of previously unknown afflictions. Explorers and colonists did not enter an empty land but rather an emptied one".

Africa
Slavery and the slave trade were part of African societies and states which supplied the Arab world with slaves before the arrival of the Europeans. Several decades prior to discovery of the New World, in response to serious military threat to Europe posed by Muslims of the Ottoman Empire, Pope Nicholas V had granted Portugal the right to subdue Muslims, pagans and other unbelievers in the papal bull Dum Diversas (1452). Six years after African slavery was first outlawed by the first major entity to do so, (Great Britain in 1833), Pope Gregory XVI followed in a challenge to Spanish and Portuguese policy, by condemning slavery and the slave trade in the 1839 papal bull In supremo apostolatus, and approved the ordination of native clergy in the face of government racism. The United States would eventually outlaw African slavery in 1865.

Clapham Sect were a group of social reformers associated with Clapham in the period from the 1780s to the 1840s. Despite the label "sect", most members remained in the established (and dominant) Church of England, which was highly interwoven with offices of state. However, its successors were in many cases outside of the established Anglican Church. 

By the close of the 19th century, European powers had managed to gain control of most of the African interior. The new rulers introduced cash-based economies which created an enormous demand for literacy and a western education—a demand which for most Africans could only be satisfied by Christian missionaries. Catholic missionaries followed colonial governments into Africa, and built schools, hospitals, monasteries and churches.

Letters and learning

The influence of the Church on Western letters and learning has been formidable. The ancient texts of the Bible have deeply influenced Western art, literature and culture. For centuries following the collapse of the Western Roman Empire, small monastic communities were practically the only outposts of literacy in Western Europe. In time, the Cathedral schools developed into Europe's earliest universities and the church has established thousands of primary, secondary and tertiary institutions throughout the world in the centuries since. The Church and clergymen have also sought at different times to censor texts and scholars. Thus different schools of opinion exist as to the role and influence of the Church in relation to western letters and learning.

One view, first propounded by Enlightenment philosophers, asserts that the Church's doctrines are entirely superstitious and have hindered the progress of civilization. Communist states have made similar arguments in their education in order to inculcate a negative view of Catholicism (and religion in general) in their citizens. The most famous incidents cited by such critics are the Church's condemnations of the teachings of Copernicus, Galileo Galilei and Johannes Kepler.

In opposition to this view, some historians of science, including non-Catholics such as J.L. Heilbron, A.C. Crombie, David Lindberg, Edward Grant, historian of science Thomas Goldstein, and Ted Davis, have argued that the Church had a significant, positive influence on the development of Western civilization. They hold that, not only did monks save and cultivate the remnants of ancient civilization during the barbarian invasions, but that the Church promoted learning and science through its sponsorship of many universities which, under its leadership, grew rapidly in Europe in the 11th and 12th centuries. Copernicus, Galileo Galilei, and Johannes Kepler all considered themselves Christian. St.Thomas Aquinas, the Church's "model theologian", argued that reason is in harmony with faith, and that reason can contribute to a deeper understanding of revelation, and so encouraged intellectual development. The Church's priest-scientists, many of whom were Jesuits, have been among the leading lights in astronomy, genetics, geomagnetism, meteorology, seismology, and solar physics, becoming some of the "fathers" of these sciences. Examples include important churchmen such as the Augustinian abbot Gregor Mendel (pioneer in the study of genetics), the monk William of Ockham who developed Ockham's Razor, Roger Bacon (a Franciscan friar who was one of the early advocates of the scientific method), and Belgian priest Georges Lemaître (the first to propose the Big Bang theory). Other notable priest scientists have included Albertus Magnus, Robert Grosseteste, Nicholas Steno, Francesco Grimaldi, Giambattista Riccioli, Roger Boscovich, and Athanasius Kircher. Even more numerous are Catholic laity involved in science:Henri Becquerel who discovered radioactivity; Galvani, Volta, Ampere, Marconi, pioneers in electricity and telecommunications; Lavoisier, "father of modern chemistry"; Vesalius, founder of modern human anatomy; and Cauchy, one of the mathematicians who laid the rigorous foundations of calculus.

Christian Scholars and Scientists have made noted contributions to science and technology fields, as well as Medicine, both historically and in modern times. Many well-known historical figures who influenced Western science considered themselves Christian such as Copernicus, Galileo, Kepler, Newton and Boyle. Some scholars and historians attributes Christianity to having contributed to the rise of the Scientific Revolution.

According to 100 Years of Nobel Prize (2005), a review of Nobel prizes awarded between 1901 and 2000, 65.4% of Nobel Prize Laureates, have identified Christianity in its various forms as their religious preference (423 prizes). Overall, Christians have won a total of 78.3% of all the Nobel Prizes in Peace, 72.5% in Chemistry, 65.3% in Physics, 62% in Medicine, 54% in Economics and 49.5% of all Literature awards.

Antiquity

Christianity began as a Jewish sect in the 1st century AD, and from the teachings of Jesus of Nazareth and his early followers. Jesus learned the texts of the Hebrew Bible and became an influential wandering preacher. Accounts of his life and teachings appear in the New Testament of the Bible, one of the bedrock texts of Western Civilization. His orations, including the Sermon on the Mount, The Good Samaritan and his declaration against hypocrisy "Let he who is without sin cast the first stone" have been deeply influential in Western literature. Many translations of the Bible exist, including the King James Bible, which is one of the most admired texts in English literature. The poetic Psalms and other passages of the Hebrew Bible have also been deeply influential in Western Literature and thought. Accounts of the actions of Jesus' early followers are contained within the Acts of the Apostles and Epistles written between the early Christian communities in particular the Pauline epistles which are among the earliest extant Christian documents and foundational texts of Christian theology.

After the death of Jesus, the new sect grew to be the dominant religion of the Roman Empire and the long tradition of Christian scholarship began. When the Western Roman Empire was starting to disintegrate, St Augustine was Bishop of Hippo Regius. He was a Latin-speaking philosopher and theologian who lived in the Roman Africa Province. His writings were very influential in the development of Western Christianity and he developed the concept of the Church as a spiritual City of God (in a book of the same name), distinct from the material Earthly City. His book Confessions, which outlines his sinful youth and conversion to Christianity, is widely considered to be the first autobiography of ever written in the canon of Western Literature. Augustine profoundly influenced the coming medieval worldview.

Byzantine Empire 

The Byzantine Empire was one of the peaks in Christian history and Christian civilization, and Constantinople remained the leading city of the Christian world in size, wealth, and culture. There was a renewed interest in classical Greek philosophy, as well as an increase in literary output in vernacular Greek.

The Byzantine science played an important role in the transmission of classical knowledge to the Islamic world and to Renaissance Italy, and also in the transmission of Islamic science to Renaissance Italy. Many of the most distinguished classical scholars held high office in the Eastern Orthodox Church.

The Imperial University of Constantinople sometimes known as the University of the Palace Hall of Magnaura, was an Eastern Roman educational institution that could trace its corporate origins to 425 AD, when the emperor Theodosius II founded the Pandidakterion. The Pandidakterion was refounded in 1046 by Constantine IX Monomachos who created the Departments of Law (Διδασκαλεῖον τῶν Νόμων) and Philosophy (Γυμνάσιον). At the time various economic schools, colleges, polytechnics, libraries and fine arts academies also operated in the city of Constantinople. And a few scholars have gone so far as to call the Pandidakterion the first "university" in the world.

The writings of Classical antiquity never ceased to be cultivated in Byzantium. Therefore, Byzantine science was in every period closely connected with ancient philosophy, and metaphysics. In the field of engineering Isidore of Miletus, the Greek mathematician and architect of the Hagia Sophia, produced the first compilation of Archimedes works c. 530, and it is through this tradition, kept alive by the school of mathematics and engineering founded c. 850 during the "Byzantine Renaissance" by Leo the Geometer that such works are known today (see Archimedes Palimpsest). Indeed, geometry and its applications (architecture and engineering instruments of war) remained a specialty of the Byzantines. Though scholarship lagged during the dark years following the Arab conquests, during the so-called Byzantine Renaissance at the end of the first millennium Byzantine scholars re-asserted themselves becoming experts in the scientific developments of the Arabs and Persians, particularly in astronomy and mathematics. The Byzantines are also credited with several technological advancements, particularly in architecture (e.g. the pendentive dome) and warfare technology (e.g. Greek fire).

Although at various times the Byzantines made magnificent achievements in the application of the sciences (notably in the construction of the Hagia Sophia), and although they preserved much of the ancient knowledge of science and geometry, after the 6th century Byzantine scholars made few novel contributions to science in terms of developing new theories or extending the ideas of classical authors.

In the final century of the Empire, Byzantine grammarians were those principally responsible for carrying, in person and in writing, ancient Greek grammatical and literary studies to early Renaissance Italy.  During this period, astronomy and other mathematical sciences were taught in Trebizond; medicine attracted the interest of almost all scholars.

In the field of law, Justinian I's reforms had a clear effect on the evolution of jurisprudence, and Leo III's Ecloga influenced the formation of legal institutions in the Slavic world.

In the 10th century, Leo VI the Wise achieved the complete codification of the whole of Byzantine law in Greek, which became the foundation of all subsequent Byzantine law, generating interest to the present day.

Preservation of Classical learning

During the period of European history often called the Dark Ages which followed the collapse of the Western Roman Empire, Church scholars and missionaries played a vital role in preserving knowledge of Classical Learning. While the Roman Empire and Christian religion survived in an increasingly Hellenised form in the Byzantine Empire centred at Constantinople in the East, Western civilisation suffered a collapse of literacy and organisation following the fall of Rome in 476AD. Monks sought refuge at the far fringes of the known world: like Cornwall, Ireland, or the Hebrides. Disciplined Christian scholarship carried on in isolated outposts like Skellig Michael in Ireland, where literate monks became some of the last preservers in Western Europe of the poetic and philosophical works of Western antiquity. By around 800AD they were producing illuminated manuscripts such as the Book of Kells, by which old learning was re-communicated to Western Europe. The Hiberno-Scottish mission led by Irish and Scottish monks like St Columba spread Christianity back into Western Europe during the Middle Ages, establishing monasteries through Anglo-Saxon England and the Frankish Empire during the Middle Ages.

Thomas Cahill, in his 1995 book How the Irish Saved Civilization, credited Irish Monks with having "saved" Western Civilization:

According to art historian Kenneth Clark, for some five centuries after the fall of Rome, virtually all men of intellect joined the Church and practically nobody in western Europe outside of monastic settlements had the ability to read or write. While church scholars at different times also destroyed classical texts they felt were contrary to the Christian message, it was they, virtually alone in Western Europe, who preserved texts from the old society.

As Western Europe became more orderly again, the Church remained a driving force in education, setting up Cathedral schools beginning in the Early Middle Ages as centers of education, which became medieval universities, the springboard of many of Western Europe's later achievements.

The Catholic Cistercian order used its own numbering system, which could express numbers from 0 to 9999 in a single sign. According to one modern Cistercian, "enterprise and entrepreneurial spirit" have always been a part of the order's identity, and the Cistercians "were catalysts for development of a market economy" in 12th-century Europe. Until the Industrial Revolution, most of the technological advances in Europe were made in the monasteries. According to the medievalist Jean Gimpel, their high level of industrial technology facilitated the diffusion of new techniques: "Every monastery had a model factory, often as large as the church and only several feet away, and waterpower drove the machinery of the various industries located on its floor." Waterpower was used for crushing wheat, sieving flour, fulling cloth and tanning – a "level of technological achievement [that] could have been observed in practically all" of the Cistercian monasteries. The English science historian James Burke examines the impact of Cistercian waterpower, derived from Roman watermill technology such as that of Barbegal aqueduct and mill near Arles in the fourth of his ten-part Connections TV series, called "Faith in Numbers".  The Cistercians made major contributions to culture and technology in medieval Europe: Cistercian architecture is considered one of the most beautiful styles of medieval architecture; and the Cistercians were the main force of technological diffusion in fields such as agriculture and hydraulic engineering.

Index Librorum Prohibitorum

The Index Librorum Prohibitorum ("List of Prohibited Books") was a list of publications prohibited by the Catholic Church. While the promulgation of the Index has been described by some as the "turning-point in the freedom of enquiry" in the Catholic world, the actual effects of the Index were minimal and it was largely ignored. John Hedley Brooke explains:

It is important not to exaggerate the oppressive effects of Index and Inquisition. The Counter-Reformation did not prevent Italian scholars from making original contributions in classical scholarship, history, law, literary criticism, logic, mathematics, medicine, philology, and rhetoric. Nor were they isolated by the Index from European scholarship. Prohibited books entered private libraries where they would be consulted by those prepared to break the rules in the interests of learning. One such collection was in the hands of Galileo’s Paduan friend, G. V. Pinelli. One can lose a sense of perspective if the condemnation of Galileo is taken to epitomize the attitude of Catholic authorities toward the natural sciences. Relatively few scientific works were placed on the Index. The attempt to put a stop to the moving earth stands out because it proved so tragic an aberration – a personal tragedy for Galileo and, in the long run, a tragedy for the Church, which overreached itself in securing a territory that would prove impossible to hold.

The first Index was published in 1559 by the Sacred Congregation of the Roman Inquisition. The last edition of the Index appeared in 1948 and publication of the list ceased 1966.

The avowed aim of the list was to protect the faith and morals of the faithful by preventing the reading of immoral books or works containing theological errors. Books thought to contain such errors included some scientific works by leading astronomers such as Johannes Kepler's Epitome astronomiae Copernicianae, which was on the Index from 1621 to 1835. The various editions of the Index also contained the rules of the Church relating to the reading, selling and pre-emptive censorship of books.

Canon law still recommends that works concerning sacred Scripture, theology, canon law, church history, and any writings which specially concern religion or good morals, be submitted to the judgement of the local Ordinary.

Some of the scientific works that were on early editions of the Index (e.g. on heliocentrism) have long been routinely taught at Catholic universities worldwide. Giordano Bruno, whose works were on the Index, now has a monument in Rome, erected over the Church's objections at the place where he was burned alive at the stake for heresy.

Protestant role in science 
According to the Merton Thesis there was a positive correlation between the rise of puritanism and protestant pietism on the one hand and early experimental science on the other. The Merton Thesis has two separate parts: Firstly, it presents a theory that science changes due to an accumulation of observations and improvement in experimental techniques and methodology; secondly, it puts forward the argument that the popularity of science in 17th-century England and the religious demography of the Royal Society (English scientists of that time were predominantly Puritans or other Protestants) can be explained by a correlation between Protestantism and the scientific values. In his theory, Robert K. Merton focused on English Puritanism and German Pietism as having been responsible for the development of the scientific revolution of the 17th and 18th centuries. Merton explained that the connection between religious affiliation and interest in science was the result of a significant synergy between the ascetic Protestant values and those of modern science. Protestant values encouraged scientific research by allowing science to study God's influence on the world and thus providing a religious justification for scientific research.

Astronomy

Historically, the Catholic Church has been a major a sponsor of astronomy, not least due to the astronomical basis of the calendar by which holy days and Easter are determined. Nevertheless, the most famous case of a scientist being tried for heresy arose in this field of science: the trial of Galileo.

The Church's interest in astronomy began with purely practical concerns, when in the 16th century Pope Gregory XIII required astronomers to correct for the fact that the Julian calendar had fallen out of sync with the sky. Since the Spring equinox was tied to the celebration of Easter, the Church considered that this steady movement in the date of the equinox was undesirable. The resulting Gregorian calendar is the internationally accepted civil calendar used throughout the world today and is an important contribution of the Catholic Church to Western Civilisation. It was introduced by Pope Gregory XIII, after whom the calendar was named, by a decree signed on 24 February 1582. In 1789, the Vatican Observatory opened. It was moved to Castel Gandolfo in the 1930s and the Vatican Advanced Technology Telescope began making observation in Arizona, US, in 1995.

The famous astronomers Nicholas Copernicus, who put the sun at the centre of the heavens in 1543, and Galileo Galilei, who experimented with the new technology of the telescope and, with its aid declared his belief that Copernicus was correct, were both practising Catholics indeed Copernicus was a Catholic clergyman. Yet the church establishment at that time held to theories devised in pre-Christian Greece by Ptolemy and Aristotle, which said that the sky revolved around the earth. When Galileo began to assert that the earth in fact revolved around the sun, he therefore found himself challenging the Church establishment at a time where the Church hierarchy also held temporal power and was engaged in the ongoing political challenge of the rise of Protestantism. After discussions with Pope Urban VIII (a man who had written admiringly of Galileo before taking papal office), Galileo believed he could avoid censure by presenting his arguments in dialogue form, but the Pope took offence when he discovered that some of his own words were being spoken by a character in the book who was a simpleton and Galileo was called for a trial before the Inquisition.

In this most famous example cited by critics of the Catholic Church's "posture towards science", Galileo Galilei was denounced in 1633 for his work on the heliocentric model of the solar system, previously proposed by the Polish clergyman and intellectual Nicolaus Copernicus. Copernicus's work had been suppressed de facto by the Church, but Catholic authorities were generally tolerant of discussion of the hypothesis as long as it was portrayed only as a useful mathematical fiction, and not descriptive of reality. Galileo, by contrast, argued from his unprecedented observations of the solar system that the heliocentric system was not merely an abstract model for calculating planetary motions, but actually corresponded to physical reality that is, he insisted the planets really do orbit the Sun. After years of telescopic observation, consultations with the Popes, and verbal and written discussions with astronomers and clerics, a trial was convened by the Tribunal of the Roman and Universal Inquisition. Galileo was found "vehemently suspect of heresy" (not "guilty of heresy", as is frequently misreported), placed under house arrest, and all of his works, including any future writings, were banned. Galileo had been threatened with torture and other Catholic scientists fell silent on the issue. Galileo's great contemporary René Descartes stopped publishing in France and went to Sweden. According to Polish-British historian of science Jacob Bronowski:

Pope John Paul II, on 31 October 1992, publicly expressed regret for the actions of those Catholics who badly treated Galileo in that trial. Cardinal John Henry Newman, in the nineteenth century, claimed that those who attack the Church can only point to the Galileo case, which to many historians does not prove the Church's opposition to science since many of the churchmen at that time were encouraged by the Church to continue their research.

Evolution

Since the publication of Charles Darwin's On the Origin of Species in 1859, the position of the Catholic Church on the theory of evolution has slowly been refined. For about 100 years, there was no authoritative pronouncement on the subject, though many hostile comments were made by local church figures. In contrast with many Protestant objections, Catholic issues with evolutionary theory have had little to do with maintaining the literalism of the account in the Book of Genesis, and have always been concerned with the question of how man came to have a soul. Modern Creationism has had little Catholic support. In the 1950s, the Church's position was one of neutrality; by the late 20th century its position evolved to one of general acceptance in recent years. However, the church insists that the human soul was immediately infused by God, and the reality of a single ancestor (commonly called monogenism) for the human race.

, the Church's official position is a fairly non-specific example of theistic evolution, stating that faith and scientific findings regarding human evolution are not in conflict, though humans are regarded as a special creation, and that the existence of God is required to explain both monogenism and the spiritual component of human origins. No infallible declarations by the Pope or an Ecumenical Council have been made. The Catholic Church's official position is fairly non-specific, stating only that faith and the origin of man's material body "from pre-existing living matter" are not in conflict, and that the existence of God is required to explain the spiritual component of man's origin.

Embryonic stem cell research
Recently, the Church has been criticized for its teaching that embryonic stem cell research is a form of experimentation on human beings, and results in the killing of a human person. Much criticism of this position has been on the grounds that the doctrine hinders scientific research; even some conservatives, taking a utilitarian position, have pointed out that most embryos from which stem cells are harvested are "leftover" from in vitro fertilization, and would soon be discarded whether used for such research or not.  The Church, by contrast, has consistently upheld its ideal of the dignity of each individual human life, and argues that it is as wrong to destroy an embryo as it would be to kill an adult human being; and that therefore advances in medicine can and must come without the destruction of human embryos, for example by using adult or umbilical stem cells in place of embryonic stem cells.

The arts

Byzantium 

Byzantine art comprises the body of Christian Greek artistic products of the Eastern Roman Empire, as well as the nations and states that inherited culturally from the empire. Though the empire itself emerged from the decline of Rome and lasted until the Fall of Constantinople in 1453. 

Many Eastern Orthodox states in Eastern Europe, as well as to some degree the Muslim states of the eastern Mediterranean, preserved many aspects of the empire's culture and art for centuries afterward. A number of states contemporary with the Byzantine Empire were culturally influenced by it, without actually being part of it (the "Byzantine commonwealth"). These included Bulgaria, Serbia, and the Rus, as well as some non-Orthodox states like the Republic of Venice and the Kingdom of Sicily, which had close ties to the Byzantine Empire despite being in other respects part of western European culture. Art produced by Eastern Orthodox Christians living in the Ottoman Empire is often called "post-Byzantine". Certain artistic traditions that originated in the Byzantine Empire, particularly in regard to icon painting and church architecture, are maintained in Greece, Serbia, Bulgaria, Macedonia, Russia and other Eastern Orthodox countries to the present day.

Architecture

Several historians credit the Catholic Church for what they consider to be the brilliance and magnificence of Western art. "Even though the church dominated art and architecture, it did not prevent architects and artists from experimenting..." Historians such as Thomas Woods refer to the western Church's consistent opposition to Byzantine iconoclasm, an eastern movement against visual representations of the divine, and the western church's insistence on building structures befitting worship. Important contributions include its cultivation and patronage of individual artists, as well as development of the Romanesque, Gothic and Renaissance styles of art and architecture.

British art historian Kenneth Clark wrote that Western Europe's first "great age of civilization" was ready to begin around the year 1000. From 1100, he wrote, monumental abbeys and cathedrals were constructed and decorated with sculptures, hangings, mosaics and works belonging to one of the greatest epochs of art, providing stark contrast to the monotonous and cramped conditions of ordinary living during the period. The Late Middle Ages produced ever more extravagant art and architecture, but also the virtuous simplicity of those such as St Francis of Assisi (expressed in the Canticle of the Sun) and the epic poetry of Dante's Divine Comedy.  Abbot Suger of the Abbey of St. Denis is considered an influential early patron of Gothic architecture. He believed that love of beauty brought people closer to God: "The dull mind rises to truth through that which is material". Clarke calls this "the intellectual background of all the sublime works of art of the next century and in fact has remained the basis of our belief of the value of art until today".

Painting and sculpture
Renaissance artists such as Raphael, Michelangelo, Leonardo da Vinci, Bernini, Botticelli, Fra Angelico, Tintoretto, Caravaggio, and Titian, were among a multitude of innovative virtuosos sponsored by the Church.  During both The Renaissance and the Counter-Reformation, Catholic artists produced many of the unsurpassed masterpieces of Western art often inspired by Biblical themes: from Michelangelo's David and Pietà sculptures, to Da Vinci's Last Supper and Raphael's various Madonna paintings. Referring to a "great outburst of creative energy such as took place in Rome between 1620 and 1660", Kenneth Clarke wrote:

[W]ith a single exception, the great artists of the time were all sincere, conforming Christians. Guercino spent much of his mornings in prayer; Bernini frequently went into retreats and practised the Spiritual Exercises of Saint Ignatius; Rubens attended Mass every morning before beginning work. The exception was Caravaggio, who was like the hero of a modern play, except that he happened to paint very well.

This conformism was not based on fear of the Inquisition, but on the perfectly simple belief that the faith which had inspired the great saints of the preceding generation was something by which a man should regulate his life.

Music

In music, Catholic monks developed the first forms of modern Western musical notation in order to standardize liturgy throughout the worldwide Church, and an enormous body of religious music has been composed for it through the ages. This led directly to the emergence and development of European classical music, and its many derivatives. The Baroque style, which encompassed music, art, and architecture, was particularly encouraged by the post-Reformation Catholic Church as such forms offered a means of religious expression that was stirring and emotional, intended to stimulate religious fervor.

The list of Catholic composers and Catholic sacred music which have a prominent place in Western culture is extensive, but includes Ludwig van Beethoven's Ode to Joy; Wolfgang Amadeus Mozart's Ave Verum Corpus; Franz Schubert's Ave Maria, César Franck's Panis angelicus, and Antonio Vivaldi's Gloria.

Literature

Christian literature is writing that deals with Christian themes and incorporates the Christian world view. This constitutes a huge body of extremely varied writing. Christian poetry is any poetry that contains Christian teachings, themes, or references. The influence of Christianity on poetry has been great in any area that Christianity has taken hold. Christian poems often directly reference the Bible, while others provide allegory.

Similarly, the list of Catholic authors and literary works is vast. With a literary tradition spanning two millennia, the Bible and Papal Encyclicals have been constants of the Catholic canon but countless other historical works may be listed as noteworthy in terms of their influence on Western society. From late Antiquity, St Augustine's book Confessions, which outlines his sinful youth and conversion to Christianity, is widely considered to be the first autobiography ever written in the canon of Western Literature. Augustine profoundly influenced the coming medieval worldview. The Summa Theologica, written 1265–1274, is the best-known work of Thomas Aquinas (c.1225–1274), and although unfinished, "one of the classics of the history of philosophy and one of the most influential works of Western literature." It is intended as a manual for beginners in theology and a compendium of all of the main theological teachings of the Church. It presents the reasoning for almost all points of Christian theology in the West. The epic poetry of the Italian Dante and his Divine Comedy of the late Middle Ages is also considered immensely influential. The English statesman and philosopher, Thomas More, wrote the seminal work Utopia in 1516. St Ignatius Loyola, a key figure in the Catholic counter-reformation, is the author of an influential book of meditations known as the Spiritual Exercises.

Scholasticism was initially a program conducted by medieval Christian thinkers attempting to harmonize the various authorities of their own tradition, and to reconcile Christian theology with classical and late antiquity philosophy, especially that of Aristotle but also of Neoplatonism. The scholastics' intellectual systems by Aquinas, called the Summa Theologiae, influenced the writings of Dante, and in turn, Dante's creation and sacramental theology has contributed to a Catholic imagination influencing writers such as J. R. R. Tolkien and William Shakespeare.

In Catholicism, "Doctor of the Church" is a name is given to a saint from whose writings the whole Church is held to have derived great advantage and to whom "eminent learning" and "great sanctity" have been attributed by a proclamation of a pope or of an ecumenical council. This honour is given rarely, and only after canonization.

The King James Version, is an English translation of the Christian Bible, has been described as one of the most important books in English culture and a driving force in the shaping of the English-speaking world.

Protestant
The arts have been strongly inspired by Protestant beliefs. Martin Luther, Paul Gerhardt, George Wither, Isaac Watts, Charles Wesley, William Cowper, and many other authors and composers created well-known church hymns. Musicians like Heinrich Schütz, Johann Sebastian Bach, George Frederick Handel, Henry Purcell, Johannes Brahms, and Felix Mendelssohn-Bartholdy composed great works of music. Prominent painters with Protestant background were, for example, Albrecht Dürer, Hans Holbein the Younger, Lucas Cranach, Rembrandt, and Vincent van Gogh. World literature was enriched by the works of Edmund Spenser, John Milton, John Bunyan, John Donne, John Dryden, Daniel Defoe, William Wordsworth, Jonathan Swift, Johann Wolfgang Goethe, Friedrich Schiller, Samuel Taylor Coleridge, Edgar Allan Poe, Matthew Arnold, Conrad Ferdinand Meyer, Theodor Fontane, Washington Irving, Robert Browning, Emily Dickinson, Emily Brontë, Charles Dickens, Nathaniel Hawthorne, Thomas Stearns Eliot, John Galsworthy, Thomas Mann, William Faulkner, John Updike, and many others.

Economic development

The notion of Christian finance refers to banking and financial activities which came into existence several centuries ago.

Christian Churches, such as the Catholic Church and Reformed Church, traditionally prohibit usury as a sin against the eighth commandment.

The activities of the Knights Templar (12th century), Mounts of Piety (appeared in 1462) or the Apostolic Chamber attached directly to the Vatican, may have given rise to operations of a banking nature or a financial nature (issuance of securities, investments) is proved.

Francisco de Vitoria, a disciple of Thomas Aquinas and a Catholic thinker who studied the issue regarding the human rights of colonized natives, is recognized by the United Nations as a father of international law, and now also by historians of economics and democracy as a leading light for the West's democracy and rapid economic development.

Joseph Schumpeter, an economist of the twentieth century, referring to the Scholastics, wrote, "it is they who come nearer than does any other group to having been the 'founders' of scientific economics." Other economists and historians, such as Raymond de Roover, Marjorie Grice-Hutchinson, and Alejandro Chafuen, have also made similar statements. Historian Paul Legutko of Stanford University said the Catholic Church is "at the center of the development of the values, ideas, science, laws, and institutions which constitute what we call Western civilization."

Catholic banking families includes House of Medici, Welser family, Fugger family, and Simonetti family.

Protestant work ethic 

The rise of Protestantism in the 16th century contributed to the development of banking in Northern Europe. In the late 18th century, Protestant merchant families began to move into banking to an increasing degree, especially in trading countries such as the United Kingdom (Barings, Lloyd), Germany (Schroders, Berenbergs) and the Netherlands (Hope & Co., Gülcher & Mulder). At the same time, new types of financial activities broadened the scope of banking far beyond its origins. One school of thought attributes Calvinism with setting the stage for the later development of capitalism in northern Europe. The Morgan family is an American Episcopal Church family and banking dynasty, which became prominent in the U.S. and throughout the world in the late 19th century and early 20th century.

The Protestant work ethic, the Calvinist work ethic, or the Puritan work ethic is a work ethic concept in theology, sociology, economics and history which emphasizes that hard work, discipline, and frugality are a result of a person's subscription to the values espoused by the Protestant faith, particularly Calvinism. The phrase was initially coined in 1904–1905 by Max Weber in his book The Protestant Ethic and the Spirit of Capitalism. Weber asserted that Protestant ethics and values along with the Calvinist doctrine of asceticism and predestination gave birth to capitalism. It is one of the most influential and cited books in sociology although the thesis presented has been controversial since its release. In opposition to Weber, historians such as Fernand Braudel and Hugh Trevor-Roper assert that the Protestant work ethic did not create capitalism and that capitalism developed in pre-Reformation Catholic communities. Just as priests and caring professionals are deemed to have a vocation (or "calling" from God) for their work, according to the Protestant work ethic the lowly workman also has a noble vocation which he can fulfil through dedication to his work.

The Protestant concept of God and man allows believers to use all their God-given faculties, including the power of reason. That means that they are allowed to explore God's creation and, according to Genesis 2:15, make use of it in a responsible and sustainable way. Thus a cultural climate was created that greatly enhanced the development of the humanities and the sciences. Another consequence of the Protestant understanding of man is that the believers, in gratitude for their election and redemption in Christ, are to follow God's commandments. Industry, frugality, calling, discipline, and a strong sense of responsibility are at the heart of their moral code. In particular, Calvin rejected luxury. Therefore, craftsmen, industrialists, and other businessmen were able to reinvest the greater part of their profits in the most efficient machinery and the most modern production methods that were based on progress in the sciences and technology. As a result, productivity grew, which led to increased profits and enabled employers to pay higher wages. In this way, the economy, the sciences, and technology reinforced each other. The chance to participate in the economic success of technological inventions was a strong incentive to both inventors and investors. The Protestant work ethic was an important force behind the unplanned and uncoordinated mass action that influenced the development of capitalism and the industrial revolution. This idea is also known as the "Protestant ethic thesis".

Episcopalians and Presbyterians tend to be considerably wealthier and better educated (having more graduate and post-graduate degrees per capita) than most other religious groups in America, and are disproportionately represented in the upper reaches of American business, law and politics, especially the Republican Party. Large numbers of the most wealthy and affluent American families as the Vanderbilts, Astors, Rockefellers, Du Ponts, Whitneys, Morgans, Fords, Mellons, Van Leers, Browns, Waynes and Harrimans are Mainline Protestant families. The Boston Brahmins, who were regarded as the nation's social and cultural elites, were often associated with the American upper class, Harvard University; and the Episcopal Church. The Old Philadelphianss were often associated with the American upper class and the Episcopal Church and Quakerism. These families were influential in the development and leadership of arts, culture, science, medicine, law, politics, industry and trade in the United States.

Some academics have theorized that Lutheranism, the dominant traditional religion of the Nordic countries, had an effect on the development of social democracy there and the Nordic model. Schröder posits that Lutheranism promoted the idea of a nationwide community of believers and led to increased state involvement in economic and social life, allowing for nationwide welfare solidarity and economic co-ordination. Esa Mangeloja says that the revival movements helped to pave the way for the modern Finnish welfare state. During that process, the church lost some of its most important social responsibilities (health care, education, and social work) as these tasks were assumed by the secular Finnish state. Pauli Kettunen presents the Nordic model as the outcome of a sort of mythical "Lutheran peasant enlightenment", portraying the Nordic model as the result of a sort of "secularized Lutheranism"; however, mainstream academic discourse on the subject focuses on "historical specificity", with the centralized structure of the Lutheran church being but one aspect of the cultural values and state structures that led to the development of the welfare state in Scandinavia.

Social justice, care-giving, and the hospital system

The Catholic Church has contributed to society through its social doctrine which has guided leaders to promote social justice and providing care to the sick and poor. In orations such as his Sermon on the Mount and stories such as The Good Samaritan, Jesus called on followers to worship God, act without violence or prejudice and care for the sick, hungry and poor. Such teachings are the foundation of Catholic Church involvement in social justice, hospitals and health care.

Today the Roman Catholic Church is the largest non-government provider of health care services in the world. It has around 18,000 clinics, 16,000 homes for the elderly and those with special needs, and 5,500 hospitals, with 65 percent of them located in developing countries. In 2010, the Church's Pontifical Council for the Pastoral Care of Health Care Workers said that the Church manages 26% of the world's health care facilities. The Church's involvement in health care has ancient origins.

Fourth century
Historians record that, prior to Christianity, the ancient world left little trace of any organized charitable effort. Christian charity and the practice of feeding and clothing the poor, visiting prisoners, supporting widows and orphan children has had sweeping impact.

Albert Jonsen, University of Washington historian of medicine, says "the second great sweep of medical history begins at the end of the fourth century, with the founding of the first Christian hospital at Caesarea in Cappadocia, and concludes at the end of the fourteenth century, with medicine well ensconced in the universities and in the public life of the emerging nations of Europe."  After the death of Eusebios in 370 and the election of Basil as bishop of Caesarea, Basil established the first formal soup kitchen, hospital, homeless shelter, hospice, poorhouse, orphanage, reform center for thieves, women's center for those leaving prostitution and many other ministries. Basil was personally involved and invested in the projects and process giving all of his personal wealth to fund the ministries.  Basil himself would put on an apron and work in the soup kitchen.  These ministries were given freely regardless of religious affiliation.  Basil refused to make any discrimination when it came to people who needed help saying that "the digestive systems of the Jew and the Christian are indistinguishable."  "...there is a striking resemblance between [Basil's] ideals and those of modern times. ...certainly he was the most modern among the pioneers of monasticism, and for this reason, if for none other, his work has a permanent interest..."

Charity has now become a universal practice. Christianity played a key role in the building and maintaining of hospitals in the Byzantine Empire. Many hospitals were built and maintained by bishops in their respective prefectures. Hospitals were usually built near or around churches, and great importance was laid on the idea of healing through salvation. When medicine failed, doctors would ask their patients to pray. This often involved icons of Cosmas and Damian, patron saints of medicine and doctors. Christianity also played a key role in propagating the idea of charity. Medicine was made, according to Oregon State University historian, Gary Ferngren (professor of ancient Greek and Rome history with a speciality in ancient medicine) "accessible to all and... simple". In the actual practice of medicine there is evidence of Christian influence. John Zacharias Aktouarios recommends the use of Holy Water mixed with a pellitory plant to act as a way to cure epilepsy.

Medieval period
The Catholic Church established a hospital system in Medieval Europe that was different from the merely reciprocal hospitality of the Greeks and family-based obligations of the Romans. These hospitals were established to cater to "particular social groups marginalized by poverty, sickness, and age", according to historian of hospitals, Guenter Risse.

The Fugger Family from Augsburg, Germany who were bankers, 500 years ago founded one of the first social housing projects in the world, which exists till today.

Industrial Revolution

The Industrial Revolution brought many concerns about the deteriorating working and living conditions of urban workers. Influenced by the German Bishop Wilhelm Emmanuel Freiherr von Ketteler, in 1891 Pope Leo XIII published the encyclical Rerum novarum, which set in context Catholic social teaching in terms that rejected socialism but advocated the regulation of working conditions. Rerum Novarum argued for the establishment of a living wage and the right of workers to form trade unions.

Quadragesimo anno was issued by Pope Pius XI, on 15 May 1931, 40 years after Rerum novarum. Unlike Leo, who addressed mainly the condition of workers, Pius XI concentrated on the ethical implications of the social and economic order. He called for the reconstruction of the social order based on the principle of solidarity and subsidiarity. He noted major dangers for human freedom and dignity, arising from unrestrained capitalism and totalitarian communism.

The social teachings of Pope Pius XII repeat these teachings, and apply them in greater detail not only to workers and owners of capital, but also to other professions such as politicians, educators, house-wives, farmers bookkeepers, international organizations, and all aspects of life including the military. Going beyond Pius XI, he also defined social teachings in the areas of medicine, psychology, sport, TV, science, law and education. Pius XII was called "the Pope of Technology" for his willingness and ability to examine the social implications of technological advances. The dominant concern was the continued rights and dignity of the individual. With the beginning of the space age at the end of his pontificate, Pius XII explored the social implications of space exploration and satellites on the social fabric of humanity asking for a new sense of community and solidarity in light of existing papal teachings on subsidiarity.

The Methodist Church, among other Christian denominations, was responsible for the establishment of hospitals, universities, orphanages, soup kitchens, and schools to follow Jesus's command to spread the Good News and serve all people. In Western nations, governments have increasingly taken up funding and organisation of health services for the poor but the Church still maintains a massive network of health care providers across the world. In the West, these institutions are increasingly run by lay-people after centuries of being run by priests, nuns and brothers, In 2009, Catholic hospitals in the US received approximately one of every six patients, according to the Catholic Health Association. Catholic Health Australia is the largest non-government provider grouping of health, community and aged care services, representing about 10% of the health sector. In 1968, nuns or priests were the chief executives of 770 of America's 796 Catholic hospitals. By 2011, they presided over 8 of 636 hospitals.

As with schooling, women have played a vital role in running and staffing Christian care institutions in Methodist hospitals, deaconesses who trained as nurses staffed the hospitals, and in Catholic hospitals, through religious institutes like the Sisters of Mercy, Little Sisters of the Poor and Sisters of St. Mary and teaching and nursing have been seen as "women's vocations". Seeking to define the role played by religious in hospitals through American history, the New York Times noted that nuns were trained to "see Jesus in the face of every patient" and that:

Asia

Protestant and Catholic  physicians and surgeons of the 19th and early 20th centuries laid many foundations for modern medicine in China. Western medical missionaries established the first modern clinics and hospitals, provided the first training for nurses, and opened the first medical schools in China. Work was also done in opposition to the abuse of opium. Medical treatment and care came to many Chinese who were addicted, and eventually public and official opinion was influenced in favor of bringing an end to the destructive trade. By 1901, China was the most popular destination for medical missionaries. The 150 foreign physicians operated 128 hospitals and 245 dispensaries, treating 1.7 million patients. In 1894, male medical missionaries comprised 14 percent of all missionaries; women doctors were four percent. Modern medical education in China started in the early 20th century at hospitals run by international missionaries.

Missionaries from other Christian denominations came to British India; Lutheran missionaries, for example, arrived in Calcutta in 1836 and by "the year 1880 there were over 31,200 Lutheran Christians spread out in 1,052 villages". Methodists began arriving in India in 1783 and established missions with a focus on "education, health ministry, and evangelism". In the 1790s, Christians from the London Missionary Society and Baptist Missionary Society, began doing missionary work in the Indian Empire. In Neyoor, the London Missionary Society Hospital "pioneered improvements in the public health system for the treatment of diseases even before organised attempts were made by the colonial Madras Presidency, reducing the death rate substantially".

Education

Missionary activity for the Catholic Church has always incorporated education of evangelized peoples as part of its social ministry. History shows that in evangelized lands, the first people to operate schools were Roman Catholics. In some countries, the Church is the main provider of education or significantly supplements government forms of education. Presently, the Church operates the world's largest non-governmental school system. Many of Western Civilization's most influential universities were founded by the Catholic Church.

A Pew Center study about religion and education around the world in 2016, found that Christians ranked as the second most educated religious group around in the world after Jews with an average of 9.3 years of schooling, and the highest of years of schooling among Christians found in Germany (13.6), New Zealand (13.5) and Estonia (13.1). Christians were also found to have the second highest number of graduate and post-graduate degrees per capita while in absolute numbers ranked in the first place (220 million). Between the various Christian communities, Singapore outranks other nations in terms of Christians who obtain a university degree in institutions of higher education (67%), followed by the Christians of Israel (63%), and the Christians of Georgia (57%).
According to the study, Christians in North America, Europe, Middle East, North Africa and Asia-Pacific regions are highly educated since many of the world universities were built by the historic Christian Churches, in addition to the historical evidence that "Christian monks built libraries and, in the days before printing presses, preserved important earlier writings produced in Latin, Greek and Arabic". According to the same study, Christians have a significant amount of gender equality in educational attainment, and the study suggests that one of the reasons is the encouragement of the Protestant Reformers in promoting the education of women, which led to the eradication of illiteracy among females in Protestant communities.
According to the same study "there is a large and pervasive gap in educational attainment between Muslims and Christians in sub-Saharan Africa" as Muslim adults in this region are far less educated than their Christian counterparts, with scholars suggesting that this gap is due to the educational facilities that were created by Christian missionaries during the colonial era for fellow believers.

Europe

The Catholic Church founded the West's first universities, which were preceded by the schools attached to monasteries and cathedrals, and generally staffed by monks and friars.

In 530, Saint Benedict wrote his monastic Rule, which became a blueprint for the organization of monasteries throughout Europe. The new monasteries preserved classical craft and artistic skills while maintaining intellectual culture within their schools, scriptoria and libraries. As well as providing a focus for spiritual life, they functioned as agricultural, economic and production centers, particularly in remote regions, becoming major conduits of civilization.

The Cluniac reform of monasteries that had begun in 910 sparked widespread monastic growth and renewal. Monasteries introduced new technologies and crops, fostered the creation and preservation of literature and promoted economic growth. Monasteries, convents and cathedrals still operated virtually all schools and libraries.

Cathedral schools began in the Early Middle Ages as centers of advanced education, some of them ultimately evolving into medieval universities. During the High Middle Ages, Chartres Cathedral operated the famous and influential Chartres Cathedral School.

Universities began springing up in Italian towns like Salerno, which became a leading medical school, translating the work of Greek and Arabic physicians into Latin. Bologna University became the most influential of the early universities, which first specialised in canon law and civil law. Paris University, specialising in such topics as theology, came to rival Bologna under the supervision of Notre Dame Cathedral. Oxford University in England later came to rival Paris in Theology and Salamanca University was founded in Spain in 1243. According to the historian Geoffrey Blainey, the universities benefited from the use of Latin, the common language of the Church, and its internationalist reach, and their role was to "teach, argue and reason within a Christian framework". The medieval universities of Western Christendom were well-integrated across all of Western Europe, encouraged freedom of enquiry and produced a great variety of fine scholars and natural philosophers, including Robert Grosseteste of the University of Oxford, an early expositor of a systematic method of scientific experimentation; and Saint Albert the Great, a pioneer of biological field research

In the 13th century, mendicant orders were founded by Francis of Assisi and Dominic de Guzmán which brought consecrated religious life into urban settings. These orders also played a large role in the development of cathedral schools into universities, the direct ancestors of the modern Western institutions.  Notable scholastic theologians such as the Dominican Thomas Aquinas worked at these universities, his Summa Theologica was a key intellectual achievement in its synthesis of Aristotelian thought and Christianity.

The university reached central Europe by the 14th century, with the foundation of institutions like Prague University and Cracow University.

The Spaniard St Ignatius Loyola founded the Society of Jesus (Jesuits) in 1540. Initially a missionary order, the Jesuits took Western learning and the Catholic faith to India, Japan, China, Canada, Central and South America and Australia. The order became increasingly involved in education, founding schools, colleges and universities across the globe and educating such notable Western scholars, intellectuals, artists and statesmen as René Descartes, Matteo Ricci, Voltaire, Pierre de Coubertin, Sir Arthur Conan Doyle, James Joyce, Alfred Hitchcock, Bing Crosby, Robert Hughes and Bill Clinton.

According to the historian Geoffrey Blainey, the university became a hallmark of Christian Civilisation, though, he writes, "in the most recent century perhaps no institution has done more to promote an alternative or secular view of the world".

Latin America

Education in Latin American began under the direction of missionaries who were sponsored by the Spanish crown. Royal policy stipulated that the Amerindians had to accept missionaries but they did not have to convert. Indians who agreed to listen to the missionaries were not subjected to work for encomenderos some of whom were notorious for brutal conditions.

A key role in the development of the university system in Latin America was played by the Catholic orders, especially by the Jesuits, but also the Dominicans and Augustinians. The founding and operation of most universities resulted from the – usually local – initiative of one of these orders, which sometimes quarreled openly over the control of the campus and the curriculum. The (temporary) dissolution of the Jesuit order in the late 18th century proved to be a major setback for the university landscape in Latin America, several of the suppressed Jesuit universities were reopened only decades later.

North America

A number of Catholic universities, schools and colleges have been formed in the United States. The religious tolerance established by the American Revolution enabled the Catholic clergy of Maryland to found Georgetown University, America's oldest Catholic university, in 1789 and it became a Jesuit institution in 1805. Saint Katharine Drexel inherited a fortune and established the Sisters of the Blessed Sacrament
for Indians and Colored People (now known as the Sisters of the Blessed Sacrament), founded schools across America and started Xavier University of Louisiana in New Orleans in 1925 for the education of African Americans.

Australasia

From 19th-century foundations, the Catholic education system in Australia has grown to be the second biggest sector after government schools with around 21 per cent of all secondary school enrolments. The Church has established primary, secondary and tertiary educational institutions. St Mary MacKillop was a 19th-century Australian nun who founded an educational religious institute, the Sisters of St Joseph of the Sacred Heart, and in 2010 became the first Australian to be canonised as a saint. Catholic education is also significant in neighbouring South Pacific nations: 11% of New Zealand students attend Catholic schools

Africa

By the close of the 19th century, European powers had managed to gain control of most of the African interior. The new rulers introduced cash-based economies which created an enormous demand for literacy and a western education—a demand which for most Africans could only be satisfied by Christian missionaries.Catholic missionaries followed colonial governments into Africa, and built schools, hospitals, monasteries and churches.

With a high number of adult baptisms, the Church is growing faster in Africa than anywhere else. It also operates a greater number of Catholic schools per parish here (3:1) than in other areas of the world.

According to Heather Sharkey, the real impact of the activities of the missionaries is still a topic open to debate in academia today.  Sharkey asserted that "the missionaries played manifold roles in colonial Africa and stimulated forms of cultural, political and religious change."  "Historians still debate the nature of their impact and question their relation to the system of European colonialism in the continent." She noted that the missionaries did great good in Africa, providing crucial social services such as modern education and health care that would have otherwise not been available. Sharkey said that, in societies that were traditionally male-dominated,  female missionaries provided women in Africa with health care knowledge and basic education. A Pew Center study about religion and education around the world in 2016, found that "there is a large and pervasive gap in educational attainment between Muslims and Christians in sub-Saharan Africa" as Muslim adults in this region are far less educated than their Christian counterparts, with scholars suggesting that this gap is due to the educational facilities that were created by Christian missionaries during the colonial era for fellow believers.

Asia

Christ Church College (1866) and St. Stephen's College (1881) are two examples of prominent church-affiliated educational institutions founded during the British Raj. Within educational institutions established during the British Raj, Christian texts, especially the Bible, were a part of the curricula. During the British Raj, Christian missionaries developed writing systems for Indian languages that previously did not have one. Christian missionaries in India also worked to increase literacy and also engaged in social activism, such as fighting against prostitution, championing the right of widowed women to remarry, and trying to stop early marriages for women. 

In India, over 25,000 schools and colleges are operated by the Church. The Jesuits' educational institutions have left a prestigious impact through their education institutions. Education has become the major priority for the Church in India in recent years with nearly 60% of the Catholic schools situated in rural areas. Even in the early part of the 19th century, Catholic schools had emphasised relief for the poor and their welfare.

Protestant role in education 

As the Reformers wanted all members of the church to be able to read the Bible, education on all levels got a strong boost. Compulsory education for both boys and girls was introduced. For example, the Puritans who established Massachusetts Bay Colony in 1628 founded Harvard College only eight years later. Seven of the first nine of what are called colonial colleges were founded by Christians, including Columbia University, Brown University, Rutgers University and Yale University (1701); a nineteenth-century book on "Colleges in America" says, "Eighty three percent of the colleges in [the U.S.] were founded by Christian philanthropy." Pennsylvania also became a centre of learning as one of the colleges not specifically Christian. Princeton University was a Presbyterian foundation. 

A large number of mainline Protestants have played leadership roles in many aspects of American life, including politics, business, science, the arts, and education. They founded most of the country's leading institutes of higher education.

The private schools and colleges established by the mainline Protestant denominations, as a rule, still want to be known as places that foster values, but few will go so far as to identify those values as Christian.... Overall, the distinctiveness of mainline Protestant identity has largely dissolved since the 1960s.

Protestantism also initiated translations of the Bible into national languages and thereby supported the development of national literatures. Episcopalians and Presbyterians tend to be considerably wealthier and better educated than most other religious groups.

Cleanliness 

The Bible has many rituals of purification relating to menstruation, childbirth, sexual relations, nocturnal emission, unusual bodily fluids, skin disease, death, and animal sacrifices. The Ethiopian Orthodox Tewahedo Church prescribes several kinds of hand washing for example after leaving the latrine, lavatory or bathhouse, or before prayer, or after eating a meal. The women in the Ethiopian Orthodox Tewahedo Church are prohibited from entering the church temple during menses; and the men do not enter a church the day after they have had intercourse with their wives.

Christianity has always placed a strong emphasis on hygiene, Despite the denunciation of the mixed bathing style of Roman pools by early Christian clergy, as well as the pagan custom of women naked bathing in front of men, this did not stop the Church from urging its followers to go to public baths for bathing, which contributed to hygiene and good health according to the Church Father, Clement of Alexandria. The Church also built public bathing facilities that were separate for both sexes near monasteries and pilgrimage sites; also, the popes situated baths within church basilicas and monasteries since the early Middle Ages. Pope Gregory the Great urged his followers on value of bathing as a bodily need.

Great bathhouses were built in Byzantine centers such as Constantinople and Antioch, and the popes allocated to the Romans bathing through diaconia, or private Lateran baths, or even a myriad of monastic bath houses functioning in eighth and ninth centuries. The Popes maintained their baths in their residences, and bath houses including hot baths incorporated into Christian Church buildings or those of monasteries, which known as "charity baths" because they served both the clerics and needy poor people. Public bathing were common in medivail Christendom larger towns and cities such as Paris, Regensburg and Naples. Catholic religious orders of the Augustinians' and Benedictines' rules contained ritual purification, and inspired by Benedict of Nursia encouragement for the practice of therapeutic bathing; Benedictine monks played a role in the development and promotion of spas. Protestant Christianity also played a prominent role in the development of the British spas.

Contrary to popular belief bathing and sanitation were not lost in Europe with the collapse of the Roman Empire. Soapmaking first became an established trade during the so-called "Dark Ages". The Romans used scented oils (mostly from Egypt), among other alternatives. By the 15th century, the manufacture of soap in the Christendom had become virtually industrialized, with sources in Antwerp, Castile, Marseille, Naples and Venice. By the mid-19th century, the English urbanised middle classes had formed an ideology of cleanliness that ranked alongside typical Victorian concepts, such as Christianity, respectability and social progress. The Salvation Army has adopted the deployment of personal hygiene, and by providing personal hygiene products, such as a toothbrush, toothpaste, and soap.

The use of water in many Christian countries is due in part to the Biblical toilet etiquette which encourages washing after all instances of defecation. The bidet is common in predominantly Catholic countries where water is considered essential for anal cleansing, and in some traditionally Orthodox and Protestant countries such as Greece and Finland respectively, where bidet showers are common.

Christian influences on the Islamic world 

Christian influences in Islam could be traced back to the Eastern Christianity, which surrounded the origins of Islam. Islam, emerging in the context of the Middle East that was largely Christian, was first seen as a Christological heresy known as the "heresy of the Ishmaelites", described as such in Concerning Heresy by Saint John of Damascus, a Syriac scholar. Eastern Christian scientists and scholars of the medieval Islamic world (particularly Nestorian Christians) contributed to the Arab Islamic civilization during the Umayyad and the Abbasid periods by translating works of Greek philosophers to Syriac and afterwards to Arabic. During the 4th through the 7th centuries, scholarly work in the Syriac and Greek languages was either newly initiated, or carried on from the Hellenistic period. Centers of learning and of transmission of classical wisdom included colleges such as the School of Nisibis, and later the School of Edessa, and the renowned hospital and medical academy of Jundishapur; libraries included the Library of Alexandria and the Imperial Library of Constantinople; other centers of translation and learning functioned at Merv, Salonika, Nishapur and Ctesiphon, situated just south of what later became Baghdad. The House of Wisdom was a library, translation institute, and academy established in Abbasid-era Baghdad, Iraq. Nestorians played a prominent role in the formation of Arab culture, with the Jundishapur school being prominent in the late Sassanid, Umayyad and early Abbasid periods. Notably, eight generations of the Nestorian Bukhtishu family served as private doctors to caliphs and sultans between the 8th and 11th centuries. Scholars and intellectuals agree Christians in the Middle East have made significant contributions to Arab and Islamic civilization since the introduction of Islam, and they have had a significant impact contributing the culture of the Mashriq, Turkey, and Iran.

Role of Christianity in science in the medieval Islamic world 

Christians especially Nestorian contributed to the Arab Islamic Civilization during the Umayyads and the Abbasids by translating works of Greek philosophers to Syriac and afterwards to Arabic. They also excelled in philosophy, science (such as Hunayn ibn Ishaq, Qusta ibn Luqa, Masawaiyh, Patriarch Eutychius, Jabril ibn Bukhtishu etc.) and theology (such as Tatian, Bar Daisan, Babai the Great, Nestorius, Toma bar Yacoub etc.) and the personal physicians of the Abbasid Caliphs were often Assyrian Christians such as the long serving Bukhtishu dynasty.

Role of Christianity in medicine in the medieval Islamic world 

A hospital and medical training center existed at Gundeshapur. The city of Gundeshapur was founded in 271 by the Sassanid king Shapur I. It was one of the major cities in Khuzestan province of the Persian empire in what is today Iran. A large percentage of the population were Syriacs, most of whom were Christians. Under the rule of Khosrau I, refuge was granted to Greek Nestorian Christian philosophers including the scholars of the Persian School of Edessa (Urfa) (also called the Academy of Athens), a Christian theological and medical university. These scholars made their way to Gundeshapur in 529 following the closing of the academy by Emperor Justinian. They were engaged in medical sciences and initiated the first translation projects of medical texts. The arrival of these medical practitioners from Edessa marks the beginning of the hospital and medical center at Gundeshapur. It included a medical school and hospital (bimaristan), a pharmacology laboratory, a translation house, a library and an observatory. Indian doctors also contributed to the school at Gundeshapur, most notably the medical researcher Mankah. Later after Islamic invasion, the writings of Mankah and of the Indian doctor Sustura were translated into Arabic at Baghdad. Daud al-Antaki was one of the last generation of influential Arab Christian writers.

Christian merchants and the silk trade

The one valuable item, sought for in Europe, which Iran possessed and which could bring in silver in sufficient quantities was silk, which was produced in the northern provinces, along the Caspian coastline. The trade of this product was done by Persians to begin with, but during the 17th century the Christian Armenians became increasingly vital in the trade of this merchandise, as middlemen.

Whereas domestic trade was largely in the hands of Persian and Jewish merchants, by the late 17th century, almost all foreign trade was controlled by the Armenians. They were even hired by wealthy Persian merchants to travel to Europe when they wanted to create commercial bases there, and the Armenians eventually established themselves in cities like Bursa, Aleppo, Venice, Livorno, Marseilles and Amsterdam. Realizing this, Shah Abbas resettled large numbers of Armenians from the Caucasus to his capital city and provided them with loans. And as the shah realized the importance of doing trade with the Europeans, he assured that the Safavid society was one with religious tolerance. The Christian Armenians thus became a commercial elite in the Safavid society and managed to survive in the tough atmosphere of business being fought over by the British, Dutch, French, Indians and Persians, by always having large capital readily available and by managing to strike harder bargains ensuring cheaper prices than what, for instance, their British rivals ever were able to.

Ottoman Empire

Immediately after the Conquest of Constantinople, Mehmet II released his portion of the city's captive Christian population with instructions to start the rebuilding of Constantinople which had been devastated by siege and war. Afterwards, he began to also repopulate the city bringing new inhabitants  – both Christian and Muslim – from the whole empire and from the newly conquered territories. Phanar was then repopulated with Greeks deported from Mouchlion in the Peloponnese and, after 1461, with citizens of Trebizond.

The roots of Greek ascendancy can be traced to the need of the Ottomans for skilled and educated negotiators as the power of their empire declined and they were compelled to rely on treaties more than the force of arms. From the 17th century onwards the Ottomans began facing problems in the conduct of their foreign relations, and were having difficulties in dictating terms to their neighbours; the Porte was faced for the first time with the need of participating in diplomatic negotiations. From 1669 until the Greek War of Independence in 1821, Phanariots made up the majority of the dragomans to the Ottoman government (the Porte) and foreign embassies due to the Greeks' higher level of education than the general Ottoman population.

Given the Ottoman tradition of generally ignoring Western European languages and cultures, officials found themselves unable to handle such affairs. The Porte subsequently assigned those tasks to the Greeks who had a long mercantile and educational tradition and could provide the necessary skills. As a result, the so−called Phanariotes, Greek and Hellenized families mostly native to Constantinople, came to occupy high posts of secretaries and interpreters to Ottoman officials and officers. The roots of Greek success in the Ottoman Empire can be traced to the Greek tradition of education and commerce exemplified in the Phanariotes. It was the wealth of the extensive merchant class that provided the material basis for the intellectual revival that was the prominent feature of Greek life in the half century and more leading to the outbreak of the Greek War of Independence in 1821. Not coincidentally, on the eve of 1821, the three most important centres of Greek learning were situated in Chios, Smyrna and Aivali, all three major centres of Greek commerce. Greek success was also favoured by Greek domination in the leadership of the Eastern Orthodox church.

The Armenians in the Ottoman Empire was made up of three religious denominations: Armenian Catholic, Armenian Protestant, and Armenian Apostolic, the Church of the vast majority of Armenians. The wealthy, Constantinople-based Amira class, a social elite whose members included the Duzians (Directors of the Imperial Mint), the Balyans (Chief Imperial Architects) and the Dadians (Superintendent of the Gunpowder Mills and manager of industrial factories). 

Scholars and intellectuals including Palestinian-American Edward Said affirm that Christians in the Arab world have made significant contributions to the Arab civilization since the introduction of Islam. The top poets in history were Arab Christians, and many Arab Christians are physicians, philosophers, government officials and people of literature. Arab Christians traditionally formed the educated upper class and they have had a significant impact in the culture of the Mashriq. Some of the most influential Arab nationalists were Arab Christians, like George Habash, founder of the Popular Front for the Liberation of Palestine, and Syrian intellectual Constantin Zureiq. Many Palestinian Christians were also active in the formation and governing of the Palestinian National Authority since 1992. The suicide bomber Jules Jammal, a Syrian military officer who blew himself up while ramming a French ship, was also an Arab Christian. While Lebanese Maronite Christian were among the Masters and Fathers of the Arabic Renaissance Al-Nahda.

Because Arab Christians formed the educated class, they had a significant impact on the politics and culture of the Arab World. Christian colleges like Saint Joseph University and American University of Beirut (Syrian Protestant College until 1920) thrived in Lebanon, Al-Hikma University in Baghdad amongst others played leading role in the development of civilization and Arab culture. Given this role in politics and culture, Ottoman ministers began to include them in their governments. In the economic sphere, a number of Christian families like Sursock became prominent. Thus, the Nahda led the Muslims and Christians to a cultural renaissance and national general despotism. This solidified Arab Christians as one of the pillars of the region and not a minority on the fringes.

Today Middle Eastern Christians are relatively wealthy, well educated, and politically moderate, as they have today an active role in various social, economical, sporting and political aspects in the Middle East. Arab Christians have significantly influenced and contributed to the Arabic culture in many fields both historically and in modern times, including literature, politics, business, philosophy, music, theatre and cinema, medicine, and science.

See also
Christian culture
Christian art
Christendom
Catholic culture

References

Christendom
Christian culture
Christianity in culture
Christianity and society
Cultural impact
Western culture